The history of Palestine is the study of the past in the region of Palestine, also known as the Land of Israel and the Holy Land, defined as the territory between the Mediterranean Sea and the Jordan River (where Israel and Palestine are today). Strategically situated between three continents, Palestine has a tumultuous history as a crossroads for religion, culture, commerce, and politics. Palestine is the birthplace of Judaism and Christianity, and has been controlled by many kingdoms and powers, including Ancient Egypt, Ancient Israel and Judah, the Persian Empire, Alexander the Great and his successors, the Hasmoneans, the Roman Empire, several Muslim Caliphates, and the Crusaders. In modern times, the area was ruled by the Ottoman Empire, then the United Kingdom and since 1948 it has been divided into Israel, the West Bank and the Gaza Strip.

Overview 
The region of Palestine/Land of Israel was among the earliest in the world to see human habitation, agricultural communities and civilization. In the Bronze Age, the Canaanites established independent city-states that were influenced by the surrounding civilizations, among them Egypt, which ruled the area in the Late Bronze Age.

During the Iron Age, two related Israelite kingdoms, Israel and Judah, controlled much of Palestine, while the Philistines occupied its southern coast. The Assyrians conquered the region in the 8th century BCE, then the Babylonians in c. 601 BCE, followed by the Persians who conquered the Babylonian Empire in 539 BCE. Alexander the Great conquered the Persian Empire in the late 330s BCE, beginning a long period of Hellenization in the region. In the late 2nd century BCE, the Hasmonean Kingdom conquered most of Palestine and parts of neighboring regions but the kingdom gradually became a vassal of Rome, which annexed the area in 63 BCE. Roman Judea was troubled by large-scale Jewish revolts, which Rome answered with by destroying Jerusalem and the Second Jewish Temple.

In the 4th century, as the Roman Empire christened, Palestine became a center of Christianity, attracting pilgrims, monks and scholars. Following the Muslim conquest of the Levant in 636–641, several Muslim ruling dynasties succeeded each other as they wrestled control of Palestine: the Rashiduns; the Umayyads, who built the Dome of the Rock and the al-Aqsa Mosque in Jerusalem; the Abbasids; the semi-independent Tulunids and the Ikhshidids; the Fatimids; and the Seljuks. In 1099, the Crusaders established the Kingdom of Jerusalem in Palestine, which the Ayyubid Sultanate reconquered in 1187. Following the invasion of the Mongol Empire, the Egyptian Mamluks reunified Palestine under its control before the Ottoman Empire conquered the region in 1516 and ruled it as Ottoman Syria largely undisrupted through to the 20th century.

During World War I the British government issued the Balfour Declaration, favoring the establishment of a national home for the Jewish people in Palestine. The British captured Palestine from the Ottomans shortly thereafter. The League of Nations gave Britain mandatory power over Palestine in 1922. British colonial rule and Arab efforts to prevent Jewish migration into Palestine led to growing sectarian violence between Arabs and Jews, eventually causing the British government to announce its intention to terminate the Mandate in 1947. The United Nations General Assembly recommended partitioning Palestine into two states; one Arab and one Jewish. However, the situation in Palestine had deteriorated into a civil war between Arabs and Jews. The Arabs rejected the Partition Plan, the Jews ostensibly accepted it, declaring the independence of the State of Israel in May 1948 upon the termination of the British mandate. Nearby Arab countries invaded Palestine, but Israel not only prevailed but also conquered far more territory of the Mandate than envisioned by the Partition Plan. During the war, 700,000, or about 80% of all Palestinians fled or were driven out of the territory that Israel conquered, and were not allowed to return, in an event that became known as the Nakba ("Catastrophe") to the Palestinians. Starting in the late 1940s and continuing for decades thereafter, about 850,000 Jews from the Arab world immigrated ("made Aliyah") to Israel.

After the war, only two parts of Palestine remained in Arab control: the West Bank (and East-Jerusalem), annexed by Jordan, and the Gaza Strip (occupied by Egypt), which were conquered by Israel during the Six-Day War in 1967. Despite international objections, Israel started to establish settlements in these occupied territories. Meanwhile, the Palestinian national movement gradually gained international recognition, largely thanks to the Palestine Liberation Organisation (PLO, founded in 1965) under the leadership of Yasser Arafat. In 1993, the Oslo Peace Accords between Israel and the PLO established the Palestinian National Authority (PA) as an interim body to run parts of Gaza and the West Bank (but not East Jerusalem) pending a permanent solution to the conflict. Further peace developments were not ratified and/or implemented, and in recent history, relations between Israel and Palestinians have been marked by repeated military conflicts, especially with the Islamist group Hamas, which also rejects the PA. In 2007, Hamas won control of Gaza from the PA, now limited to the West Bank. In November 2012, the State of Palestine (the name used by the PA) became a non-member observer state in the UN, allowing it to take part in General Assembly debates and improving its chances of joining other UN agencies.

Prehistory

The earliest human remains in the region were found in Ubeidiya, some 3 km south of the Sea of Galilee, in the Jordan Rift Valley. The remains are dated to the Pleistocene, c. 1.5 million years ago. These are traces of the earliest migration of Homo erectus out of Africa. The site yielded hand axes of the Acheulean type.

Nahal Amud between Safed and the Sea of Galilee was the site of the first prehistoric dig in Palestine. The discovery of the "Galilee Skull" in the Zuttiyeh Cave in 1925 provided some clues to human development in the area. Qafzeh is a paleoanthropological site south of Nazareth where eleven significant fossilised Homo sapiens skeletons have been found at the main rock shelter. These anatomically modern humans, both adult and infant, are now dated to about 90–100,000 years old, and many of the bones are stained with red ochre, which is conjectured to have been used in the burial process, a significant indicator of ritual behavior and thereby symbolic thought and intelligence. 71 pieces of unused red ochre also littered the site.

Mount Carmel has yielded several important findings, among them Kebara Cave that was inhabited between 60,000 and 48,000 BP and where the most complete Neanderthal skeleton found to date. The Tabun cave was occupied intermittently during the Lower and Middle Paleolithic ages (500,000 to around 40,000 years ago). Excavations suggest that it features one of the longest sequences of human occupation in the Levant. In the nearby Skhul Cave excavations revealed the first evidence of the late Epipalaeolithic Natufian culture, characterized by the presence of abundant microliths, human burials and ground stone tools. This also represents one area where Neanderthals – present in the region from 200,000 to 45,000 years ago – lived alongside modern humans dating to 100,000 years ago. In the caves of Shuqba in Ramallah and Wadi Khareitun in Bethlehem, stone, wood and animal bone tools were found and attributed to the Natufian culture (c. 12,800–10,300 BCE). Other remains from this era have been found at Tel Abu Hureura, Ein Mallaha, Beidha and Jericho.

Between 10,000 and 5000 BCE, agricultural communities were established. Evidence of such settlements were found at Tel es-Sultan in Jericho and consisted of a number of walls, a religious shrine, and a  tower with an internal staircase Jericho is believed to be one of the oldest continuously inhabited cities in the world, with evidence of settlement dating back to 9000 BCE, providing important information about early human habitation in the Near East. Along the Jericho–Dead Sea–Bir es-Saba–Gaza–Sinai route, a culture originating in Syria, marked by the use of copper and stone tools, brought new migrant groups to the region contributing to an increasingly urban fabric.

Bronze and Iron Ages

Canaanites

By the early Bronze Age (3000–2200 BCE), independent Canaanite city-states situated in plains and coastal regions and surrounded by mud-brick defensive walls were established relying on nearby agricultural hamlets for their food. The Canaanite city-states held trade and diplomatic relations with Egypt and Syria. Parts of the Canaanite urban civilization were destroyed around 2300 BCE, though there is no consensus as to why. Incursions by nomads from the east of the Jordan River who settled in the hills followed soon thereafter.

In the Middle Bronze Age (2200–1500 BCE), Canaan was influenced by the surrounding civilizations of ancient Egypt, Mesopotamia, Phoenicia, Minoan Crete, and Syria. Diverse commercial ties and an agriculturally based economy led to the development of new pottery forms, the cultivation of grapes, and the extensive use of bronze. Burial customs from this time seemed to be influenced by a belief in the afterlife. The Middle Kingdom Egyptian Execration Texts attest to Canaanite trade with Egypt during this period. The Minoan influence is apparent at Tel Kabri.

A DNA analysis published in May 2020 showed that migrants from the Caucasus mixed with the local population to produce the Canaanite culture that existed during the Bronze Age.

Egyptian dominance 

During 1550–1400 BCE, the Canaanite city-states became vassals to the New Kingdom of Egypt, which expanded into the Levant under Ahmose I and Thutmose I. Political, commercial and military events towards the end of this period (1450–1350 BCE) were recorded by ambassadors and Canaanite proxy rulers for Egypt in 379 cuneiform tablets known as the Amarna Letters. These refer to local chieftains, such as Biridiya of Megiddo, Lib'ayu of Shechem and Abdi-Heba in Jerusalem. Abdi-Heba is a Hurrian name, and enough Hurrians lived in Canaan at that time to warrant contemporary Egyptian texts naming the locals as Ḫurru. 
In the first year of his reign, the pharaoh Seti I (ca.1294–1290 BCE) waged a campaign to resubordinate Canaan to Egyptian rule, thrusting north as far as Beit She'an, and installing local vassals to administer the area in his name. A burial site yielding a scarab bearing his name, found within a Canaanite coffin excavated in the Jezreel Valley, attests to Egypt's presence in the area.

Late Bronze Age collapse 
The Late Bronze Age collapse had greatly affected the Ancient Near East, including Canaan. The Egyptians withdrew from the area. Layers of destruction from the crisis period were found in several sites, including Hazor, Beit She'an, Megiddo, Lachish, Ekron, Ashdod and Ashkelon. The layers of destruction in Lachish and Megiddo date back to about 1130 BCE, More than a hundred years after the destruction of Hazor circa 1250 BCE, and point to a prolonged period of decline in local civilization.

Beginning in the late 13th century and continuing to the early 11th century, hundreds of smaller, unprotected village settlements were founded in Canaan, many in the mountainous regions. In some of them, the characteristics identified in a later period with the inhabitants of Israel and Judah, such as the four-room house, appear for the first time. The number of villages reduced in the 11th century, counterbalanced by other settlements reaching the status of fortified townships.

Early Israelites and Philistines 

After the withdrawal of the Egyptians, Canaan became home to the Israelites and the Philistines. The first record of the name Israel is documented in the Merneptah stele, established by Pharaoh Merneptah around 1209 BCE. The Israelites settled the central highlands, a loosely defined highland region stretching from the Judean hills in the south to the Samarian hills in the north. Based on the archaeological evidence, they did not overtake the region by force, but instead branched out of the indigenous Canaanite peoples. The population, at most forty-five thousand, were poor and lived relatively isolated from the Canaanite city-states that occupied the plains and the coastal regions. In contrast to the Philistines, the Israelites did not eat pork, preferred plain pottery, and circumcised their boys.

Sometime in the 12th century, the Philistines, who had immigrated from the Aegean region, settled in the southern coast of Palestine. Traces of Philistines appeared at about the same time as the Israelites. The Philistines are credited with introducing iron weapons, chariots, and new ways of fermenting wine to the local population. Over time, the Philistines integrated with the local population and they, like other people in Palestine, were engulfed by first the Assyrian empire and later the Babylonian empire. In the 6th century, they disappeared from written history.

Kingdoms of Israel and Judah 

Two related Israelite kingdoms, Israel and Judah, emerged during the 10th and 9th centuries BCE: Israel in the north and Judah in the south. Israel was the more prosperous of the kingdoms and developed into a regional power. By the 8th century BCE, the Israelite population had grown to some 160,000 individuals over 500 settlements.

Israel and Judah continually clashed with the kingdoms of Ammon, Edom and Moab, located in modern-day Jordan, and with the kingdom of Aram-Damascus, located in modern-day Syria. The northwestern region of the Transjordan, known then as Gilead, was also settled by the Israelites. Hebrew flourished as a spoken language in the Kingdoms of Israel and Judah during the period from about 1200 to 586 BCE.

The Omride dynasty greatly expanded the northern kingdom of Israel. In the mid-9th century, it stretched from the vicinity of Damascus in the north to the territory of Moab in the south, ruling over a large number of non-Israelites. In 853 BCE, the Israelite king Ahab led a coalition of anti-Assyrian forces at the Battle of Qarqar that repelled an invasion by King Shalmaneser III of Assyria. Some years later, King Mesha of Moab, a vassal of Israel, rebelled against it, destroying the main Israelite settlements in the Transjordan.

In the 830s BCE, king Hazael of Aram Damascus conquered the fertile and strategically important northern parts of Israel which devastated the kingdom. He also destroyed the Philistine city of Gath. During the late 9th century BCE, Israel under King Jehu became a vassal to Assyria and was forced to pay tribute.

Assyrian invasions 

King Tiglath Pileser III of Assyria was discontent with the empire's system of vassal states and set to control them more directly or even turn then into Assyrian provinces. Tiglath Pileser and his successors conquered Palestine beginning in 734 BCE to about 645 BCE. This policy had lasting consequences for Palestine as its strongest kingdoms were crushed, inflicting heavy damage, and parts of the kingdoms' populations were deported.
The Kingdom of Israel was eradicated in 720 BCE as its capital, Samaria, fell to the Assyrians. The records of Sargon II indicate that he deported 27,290 inhabitants of the kingdom to northern Mesopotamia. Many Israelites migrated to the southern kingdom of Judah. When Hezekiah rose to power in Judah in 715 BCE, he forged an alliance with Egypt and Ashkelon, and revolted against the Assyrians by refusing to pay tribute. In response, Sennacherib of Assyria attacked the fortified cities of Judah. In 701 BCE, Sennacherib laid siege to Jerusalem, though the city was never taken. 
The Assyrian expansion continued southward, gradually conquering Egypt and taking Thebes in 664 BCE. The kingdom of Judah, along with a line of city-states on the coastal plain were allowed to remain independent; from an Assyrian standpoint, they were weak and nonthreatening.

Babylonian and Persian periods

Babylonian period 

Struggles over succession following the death of King Ashurbanipal in 631 BCE weakened the Assyrian empire. This allowed Babylon to revolt and to eventually conquer most of Assyria's territory. Meanwhile, Egypt reasserted its power and created a system of vassal states in the region that were obliged to pay taxes in exchange for military protection.

In 616 BCE, Egypt sent its armies north to intervene on behalf of the fading Assyrian empire against the Babylonian threat. The intervention was unsuccessful; Babylon took Assyria's Nineveh in 612 BCE and two years later Harran. In 609 the Egyptian pharaoh Necho II again marched north with his army. For some reason, he executed the Judahite king Josiah at the Egyptian base Megiddo and a few months later he installed Jehoiakim as the king of Judah. At the Battle of Carchemish in 605 BCE, the Babylonians routed the Egyptian forces, causing them to flee back to the Nile. The next year, the Babylonian king Nebuchadnezzar destroyed the Philistine cities Ashdod, Ekron, Ashkelon, and Gaza. By 601 BCE, all the former states in the Levant had become Babylonian colonies.

The Babylonians continued the practices of their predecessors the Assyrians and deported populations that resisted its military might. Many of them were settled in Babylon and were used to rebuild the country which had been devastated through the long years of conflict with the Assyrians.

In 601 BCE Nebuchadnezzar launched a failed invasion of Egypt which forced him to withdraw to Babylon to rebuild his army. This failure was interpreted as a sign of weakness, causing some vassal states to defect, among them Judah, leading to the Judahite–Babylonian War. Nebuchadnezzar responded by laying siege to Jerusalem in 598 to end its revolt. In 597, the king Jeconiah of Judah, together with Jerusalem's aristocracy and priesthood, were deported to Babylon.

In 587 BCE Nebuchadnezzar besieged and destroyed Jerusalem, bringing an end to the kingdom of Judah. A large number of Judahites were exiled to Babylon. Judah and the Philistine city-states of Gaza, Ashkelon, Ashdod, and Ekron, were dissolved and incorporated into the Neo-Babylonian Empire as provinces. Judah became the province of Yehud, a Jewish administrative division of the Neo-Babylonian Empire.

Persian (Achaemenid) period 

Following Cyrus the Great's conquest of Babylon in 539 BCE, Palestine became part of the Persian Achaemenid Empire. At least five Persian provinces existed in the region: Yehud Medinata, Samaria, Gaza, Ashdod, and Ascalon. The Phoenician city-states continued to prosper in present-day Lebanon, while the Arabian tribes inhabited the southern deserts.

In contrast to his predecessors, who controlled conquered populations using mass-deportations, Cyrus issued a proclamation granting subjugated nations religious freedom. The Persians resettled exiles in their homelands and let them rebuilt their temples. According to some scholars, this policy helped them to present themselves as liberators, gaining them the goodwill of the people in the empire's provinces.

In 538 BCE, the Persians allowed the return of exiled Judeans to Jerusalem. The Judeans, who came to be known as Jews, settled in what became known as Yehud Medinata or Yehud, a self-governing Jewish province under Persian rule. The First Temple in Jerusalem, which had been destroyed by the Babylonians, was rebuilt under the auspices of the returned Jewish population.

Major religious transformations took place in Yehud Medinata. it was during that period that the Israelite religion became exclusively monotheistic – the existence of other Gods was now denied. Previously, Yahweh, Israel's national god, had been seen as one god among many. Many customs and behavior that would come to characterize Judaism were adopted.

The region of Samaria was inhabited by the Samaritans, an ethno-religious group who, like the Jews, worship Yahweh and claim ancestry to the Israelites. It is widely believed the Samaritans were a blend of nationalities whom the Assyrians had resettled in the area with some of the remaining Israelites. The Samaritan temple cult, centered around Mount Gerizim, competed with the Jews' temple cult centered around Mount Moriah in Jerusalem and led to long-lasting animosity between the two groups. Remnants of their temple at Mount Gerizim near Shechem dates to the 5th century.

Another people in Palestine was the Edomites. Originally, their kingdom occupied the southern area of modern-day Jordan but later they were pushed westward by nomadic tribes coming from the east, among them the Nabataeans, and therefore migrated into southern parts of Judea. This migration had already begun a generation or two before the Babylonian conquest of Judah, but as Judah was weakened the pace accelerated. Their territory became known as Idumea.

Around the turn of the 6th and 5th centuries BCE, the Persians gave the Phoenician kings of Tyre and Sidon, based in modern-day Lebanon, control over the coastal plain all the way to Ashdod. Perhaps to facilitate maritime trade or as a repayment for their naval services. At about the same time, the Upper Galilee was also granted to Tyre. In the middle of the 4th century the Phoenicians occupied the entire coast as far as Ascalon in the southern coastal plain.

Nomadic Arabian tribes roamed the Negev desert. They were of paramount strategic and economic importance to the Persians due to their control of desert trade routes stretching from Gaza in the north, an important trading center, to the Arabian peninsula in the south. Unlike the people in the provinces, the tribes were considered "friends" with the empire rather than subjects and they enjoyed some independence from Persia. Until the middle of the 4th century, the Qedarites were the dominant tribe whose territory ran from the Hejaz in the south to the Negev in the north. Around 380 BCE, the Qedarites joined a failed revolt against the Persians and as a consequence they lost their frankincense trade privileges. The trade privileges were taken over by the Nabataeans, an Arab tribe whose capital was in Petra in Transjordan. They established themselves in the Negev where they built a flourishing civilization.

Despite the devastating Greco-Persian Wars, Greek cultural influences rose steadily. Greek coins began to circulate in the late 6th and early 5th centuries. Greek traders established trading posts along the coast in the 6th century from which Greek ceramics, artworks, and other luxury items were imported. These items were popular and no well-to-do household in Palestine would have lacked Greek pottery. Local potters imitated the Greek merchandise, though the quality of their goods were inferior to the Greeks. The first coins in Palestine were minted by the Phoenicians followed by Gaza, Ashkelon, and Ashdod. Yehud began minting coins in the second quarter of the 4th century.

In 404 BCE, Egypt threw off the Persian yoke and began extending its domain of influence and military might in Palestine and Phoenicia, leading to confrontations with Persia. The political pendulum swung back and forth as territory was conquered and reconquered. For a brief period of time, Egypt controlled both coastal Palestine and Phoenicia. Egypt was eventually reconquered by Persia in 343.

By the 6th century, Aramaic became the common language in the north, in Galilee and Samaria, replacing Hebrew as the spoken language in Palestine, and it became the region's lingua franca. Hebrew remained in use in Judah; however the returning exiles brought back Aramaic influence, and Aramaic was used for communicating with other ethnic groups during the Persian period. Hebrew remained as a language for the upper class and as a religious language.

Hellenistic period

In the late 330s BCE, Alexander the Great conquered Palestine on his way to Egypt. The conquest was relatively uncomplicated as Persian control of the region had already waned. Tyre and Gaza were the only cities that did not immediately submit to Alexander who slaughtered their citizens as punishment.

After Alexander's death in 323 BCE, his vast empire was divided between his generals, known as the Diadochi ("successors"), who fought each other for control over it. Ptolemy I Soter established himself as the ruler of Egypt. His main rival was the Diadochi Antigonus I Monophthalmus with whom he wrestled control of Palestine for several decades. Ptolemy took Palestine in 320-318 BCE, but had to withdraw in 315 BCE to avoid a confrontation with Antigonus who had invaded. With the help of Diadochi Seleucus I Nicator, he captured Palestine in 312 BCE, but could only hold it for a few months as Antigonus's armies were approaching again. The events of 312 BCE repeated in 302 BCE, but in 301 BCE Antigonus was defeated by a coalition of Diadochi kings and the province was awarded to Seleucus. Seleucus did not attempt to conquer the province he was due and his former ally, Ptolemy, occupied it. However, he did not relinquish his claim to it, leading to several wars being fought for the control of Palestine between Ptolemy's and Seleucid's successors over the following century. In the fifth of these wars, in 201/200 BCE, the Seleucids conquered Palestine from the Ptolemies for good.

In contrast to the Persians, who stayed out of the internal affairs of the conquered peoples, the Greeks introduced Greek language, culture, customs, religion and architecture to the regions that they controlled – a process called hellenization ("greekification"). Hellenization was pervasive in Palestine; speaking Greek and adopting Greek customs conferred many benefits for the upper classes. Hellenistic pottery absorbing Philistine traditions flourished.

The Greeks also founded many Greek cities, known as poleis, whose residents were granted tax exemptions and other privileges. The poleis had Greek style governments, Greek institutions and temples for the worship of Greek gods. Many of these cities were not new establishments but rather were rebuilt and renamed, often after the kings themselves. For example, Akko was refounded as Ptolemais (becoming the region's capital during the Ptolemaic era) and Rabbath-Ammon, the capital of the Ammonites, was renamed Philadelphia (after Ptolemy II Philadelphos). The poleis won the Greeks the loyalty of the residents whose living standards rose.

Ptolemaic and Seleucid eras 
The Ptolemaic era lasted to 201 BCE and was, despite the numerous wars, a time of peace and prosperity for Palestine. Trade and commerce flourished, particularly in Palestine's most Hellenized areas.

A fundamental concept for the Ptolemaic kings and all Hellenistic monarchs was to treat all land as their personal property. Agriculture was controlled using a complicated system of leasing and state supervision. State monopolies were enacted on a number of important goods such as oil, grain, salt, linen, and beer. The Ptolemies also introduced tax farming; the auctioning of tax collection to wealthy locals. If the tax farmer failed to raise the bidded amount, they had to pay for shortfalls out of their own pockets but they could keep the surpluses. Tax farming proved to be very lucurative for many persons who engaged in it. Unlike in Egypt, where tax farmers and bureaucrats for the most part were Greeks, in Palestine it allowed an indigenous upper class to interpose itself between the rural population and the state apparatus. These policies made the Ptolemaic kings some of the richest in the world, but also guaranteed the greatest possible exploitation of the under classes.

The Jewish community in Alexandria became the most important center for Jewish culture outside Palestine. During the reign of Ptolemy II Philadelphus, sages brought from Jerusalem to Alexandria produced the Septuagint (LXX), the first Greek translation of the Hebrew Bible. Due to its monumental impact, it has been referred to as the greatest translation of all time.

The Seleucids defeated the Ptolemies in 201, but it took them until 198 before they had the former province of Syria and Phoenicia under their control. The continuing Hellenization of Palestine pitted traditional against eagerly Hellenizing Jews. The latter felt that the former's orthodoxy held them back. In 175 BCE, Jerusalem's high priest Jason convinced the Seleucid king Antiochus IV to refound the city as a polis named Antiochia.

Hasmonean period 

In 167, Antiochus IV issued an edict outlawing the practice of Judaism, including Sabbath observance, circumcision, and dietary laws. Violations were punishable by death. The Second Jewish Temple was rededicated to the Greek god Zeus. The cause for the repression is unknown; one theory holds that the hellenizers proposed it to the king to deal a fatal blow to the traditionalists, another that it was punishment for unrest instigated by the pious, a third that the king mistook a failed coup in the temple's leadership for rebellion. Whatever the cause was, it led to a revolt, led by Judas Maccabeus of the Hasmonean family, during which Jewish rebels conducted guerilla warfare against both Seleucid troops and hellenized, "lawless" Jews.

In 164 Antiochus IV (or his son Antiochus V) rescinded the edict and allowed the Jews to cleanse and rededicate the temple to their God, an event commemorated by the Jewish holiday Hanukkah. However, the same year a century-long war of succession broke out in the Seleucid royal house, destabilizing the empire. Judas took advantage of the situation and renewed the hostilities. The rebels were also supported by the Romans who sought to undermine the Seleucids.

Judas was succeeded by his brother Jonathan, who skillfully played off the claimants to the Selecuid throne against each other to extract concessions. The Seleucids reached an accord with Jonathan in 157 BCE and later appointed him High Priest – Judea's most important office. Jonathan's and his successor and brother Simon's diplomacy paid off and around 140 Judea was de facto independent.

The Seleucid's continued infighting gave Judea free reigns and from 130 it began to conquer its neighbors. Non-Jews in conquered territory were forcibly converted to Judaism, expelled or made to pay tribute. The Edomites became Jewish, and the Samaritan temple at Mount Gerizim was destroyed. By 100, Judea included the entire Palestinian hinterland from the Galilee in the north to the Negev in the south. From 100 to 70 the Hasmoneans conquered many poleis along the coast and in the Transjordan. The warfare and associated plunder made both the Hasmonean kings and Jerusalem's temple institution incredibly rich.

Roman period 
In 63 BCE, a war of succession in the Hasmonean court provided the Roman general Pompey with the opportunity to make the Jewish kingdom a client of Rome, starting a centuries-long period of Roman rule. After sacking Jerusalem, he installed Hyrcanus II, one of the Hasmonean pretenders, as High Priest but denied him the title of king. Most of the territory the Hasmoneans had conquered were awarded to other kingdoms, and Judea now only included Judea proper, Samaria (except for the city of Samaria which was renamed Sebaste), southern Galilee, and eastern Idumaea. In 57 BCE, the Romans and Jewish loyalists stamped out an uprising organized by Hyrcanus' enemies. Hoping to quell further unrest, the Romans restructured the kingdom into five autonomous districts, each with its own religious council with centers in Jerusalem, Sepphoris, Jericho, Amathus, and Gadara.

Poleis that had been occupied or even destroyed by the Hasmoneans were rebuilt and they regained their self-governing status. This amounted to a rebirth for many of the Greek cities and made them Rome's trusty allies in an otherwise unruly region. They expressed their gratitude by adopting new dating systems commemorating Rome's advent, renaming themselves after Roman officials, or minting coins with monograms and imprints of Roman officials.

The turmoil in the Roman world brought by the Roman civil wars relaxed Rome's grip on Judea. In 40 BCE, the Parthian Empire and their Jewish ally Antigonus the Hasmonean defeated a pro-Roman Jewish force led by high priest Hyrcanus II, Phasael and Herod I, the son of Hyrcanus' leading partisan Antipater. They managed to conquer Syria and Palestine. Antigonus was made King of Judea. Herod fled to Rome, where he was elected "King of the Jews" by the Roman Senate and was given the task of retaking Judea. In 37 BCE, with Roman support, Herod reclaimed Judea, and the short-lived reemergence of the Hasmonean dynasty came to an end.

Herodian dynasty and Roman Judea 

Herod I, or as he later became known, Herod the Great, ruled from 37 to 4 BCE. He became known for his many building projects, for increasing the region's prosperity, but also for being a tyrant and involved in many political and familial intrigues.

Herod rebuilt Jerusalem from top to bottom, greatly increasing the city's prestige. One of Herod's greatest achievements was the reconstruction of the Second Temple, which became one of the largest structures in the empire, with an enormous 14 hectare courtyard, still visible today as the Temple Mount. The Temple functioned as the center of Jewish sacrificial worship, as well as a national bank, and a tourist and pilgrimage destination, drawing visitors from throughout the empire, many of which passed through Caesarea Maritima, a newly built port city. Caesarea was by far the largest port in Roman Judea and one of largest in the whole eastern Mediterranean. The city was built using state-of-the-art Roman engineering complete with a market, aqueduct, government offices, baths, villas, a circus, and pagan temples.

Throughout this period, the Jewish population gradually increased, and the region saw a massive wave of urbanization. More than 30 towns and cities of different sizes were founded, rebuilt, or enlarged in a relatively short period. The Jewish population of the land on the eve of the great revolt may have been as high as 2.2 million. Jerusalem itself reached a peak in size and population at the end of the Second Temple period, when the city covered  and had a population of 200,000.

Many Jews saw Herod as a usurper who had stolen the throne from the Hasmoneans. He also selected his own appointees as High Priest. Furthermore, the Jews had always looked down on the Idumeans as racially impure. Worse, Herod's mother was an Arab and it was commonly held that one couldn't be a Jew unless born by a Jewish mother. The orthodox despised him for his Greek taste, the Sadducees for how he had emasculated the Sanhedrin, and the Pharisees despised anyone who despised the Law. Among his sacrileges included placing a golden eagle, a symbol of Roman power, on top of the gate to the temple. However, he maintained excellent relations with his Roman overlord who rewarded him with large swathes of territory to incorporate into his kingdom.

Following Herod's death in 4 BCE, a wave of unrest shook the region. It was swiftly quashed by Herod's son Archelaus with the help of the Romans. Herod's kingdom was divided and given to his three sons. In 6 CE Archelaus was banished for misrule and Judea came under direct Roman rule.

Jewish-Roman wars 

Tensions in Judea grew after direct Roman rule was reestablished. The upper class favored the Romans because it guaranteed their privileged position, but the rural class did not and their yearning for independence and revolution grew. Vivid memories of the Hasmonean kings, fueled by eschatological and messianic expectations, created dangerous delusions about the prospects of rebelling.

In 66 CE, the First Jewish-Roman War, also known as the Great Jewish Revolt, erupted. The war lasted for four years and was crushed by the Roman emperors Vespasian and Titus. In 70 CE, the Romans captured the city of Jerusalem and destroyed both the city and the Second Temple. The events were described by the Jewish historian Josephus, who writes that 1,100,000 Jews perished during the revolt, while a further 97,000 were taken captive. The Fiscus Judaicus was imposed on Jews all across the Roman Empire as part of reparations.

It was during this period that the split of early Christianity and Judaism occurred. The Jewish Pharisee movement, led by Yochanan ben Zakai, made peace with Rome and survived. Following the Great Revolt, Jews continued to live in Palestine in significant numbers, and were allowed to practice their religion. An estimated 2/3 of the population in the Galilee and 1/3 of the coastal region were Jewish. Jews again revolted against Rome in 132 CE. The causes for the revolt are unknown; one theory holds that a ban on circumcision (which the Romans saw as genital mutilation) sparked it, another that the emperor's decision in 130 CE to re-found Jerusalem, still in ruins after its destruction in 70 CE, as a Roman colony, complete with a pagan temple, offended pious Jews enough to revolt. The Bar Kokhba Revolt took three years to put down and incurred massive costs on both sides. Consequently, the center of Palestinian Jewish life moved to the Galilee, which had mostly stayed out of the revolt. The Bar Kokhba revolt saw a major shift in the population of Palestine. The sheer scale and scope of the overall destruction is described in a late epitome of Dio Cassius's Roman History, where he states that Roman war operations in the country had left some 580,000 Jews dead, with many more dying of hunger and disease, while 50 of their most important outposts and 985 of their most famous villages were razed to the ground. "Thus," writes Dio Cassius, "nearly the whole of Judaea was made desolate."

Province of Syria Palaestina 

During or after the Bar Kohkba Revolt, Hadrian joined the province of Judea with Galilee and the Paralia to form the new province of Syria Palaestina. Some scholars view these actions as an attempt to disconnect the Jewish people from their homeland, but this theory is debated.

Jerusalem was re-established as the Aelia Capitolina, a greatly diminished military colony with perhaps no more than 4,000 residents. Jews were banned from the city and from settling in its vicinity as punishment for the Bar Kokbha revolt, though the ban was not strictly enforced and a slow trickle of Jews settled in the city over the subsequent centuries. In the late 2nd and early 3rd century, new cities were founded at Eleutheropolis, Diospolis, and Nicopolis.

In the 260s, the Palmyrene king Odaenathus helped the Romans defeat the Persians (Sasanian Empire) and became, though nominally still Rome's vassal, the real ruler of Syria Palaestina and Rome's other holdings in the Near East. His widow Zenobia declared herself the Empress of the breakaway Palmyrene Empire but she was defeated by the Romans in 272.

Religious developments 

The first century was a time of religious revival in Jewish Palestine. eschatological beliefs, which to the Jews meant divine intervention that would free them from foreign domination and usher in a golden age of peace and prosperity, were common. Eschatologists taught that people should repent in anticipation of a final judgement, preceding this golden age. A number of Jewish sects were active, one of which being the followers of Jesus whose beliefs formed the basis of Christianity.

Prior to the Great Revolt, blood sacrifice in the temple was the main form of Jewish worship; men were expected to bring sacrifice on a regular basis and people living abroad either made pilgrimage or sent deputies who brought animals to sacrifice in their name. This gave the priesthood, who officiated in the temple, considerable economic power, political authority, and prestige. This social order, that had existed for centuries, vanished along with its institutions – the office of the High Priest and the Sanhedrin – when the temple was destroyed. In its place, a new form of Judaism emerged, replacing the temple with the synagogue and sacrifice with prayer and study of Scripture. Spearheading this transformation were the spiritual successors of the Pharisees, the Rabbis, one of the groups for whom the temple wasn't central. They feared that traditions and religious laws that up to that point had only been passed down orally would be lost and began writing them down. This effort culminated in the Babylonian Talmud, compiled around 499 in Babylon.

Both Christians and Jews abhorred the obligatory Roman practice of making sacrifices to the Roman Gods as idolatry. Jews were exempted from making such sacrifices and from 70 CE instead paid a tax known as fiscus Judaicus. Christians, on the other hand, were not exempted and their unwillingness to make sacrifices led to them being persecuted.

Byzantine period 

The tide turned in Christianity's favor in the 4th century. The century began with the most intense persecution of Christians the empire had seen, but ended with Christianity becoming the Roman state church. Perhaps more than half of the empire's population had then converted to Christianity. Instrumental to this transformation was Rome's first Christian emperor Constantine the Great. He had ascended the throne by defeating his competitors in series of civil wars and he credited his victories to Christianity. Constantine became a fervent supporter of Christianity and issued laws conveying upon the church and its clergy fiscal and legal privileges and immunities from civic burdens. He also sponsored ecumenical councils, such as the Council of Nicaea, to settle theological disputes between Christian factions.

Rome's Christening had a profound impact on Palestine. Churches were built on sites venerated by Christians such as the Church of the Holy Sepulchre in Jerusalem where Jesus was thought to have been crucified and buried, and the Church of the Nativity in Bethlehem where he was thought to have been born. Of the over 140 Christian monasteries built in Palestine in this period, some were among the oldest in the world, including Mar Saba, which is still in use to this day, Saint George's Monastery in Wadi Qelt, and the Monastery of the Temptation near Jericho. Men flocked to live as pious hermits in the Judean wilderness and soon Palestine became a center for eremitic life. The ecumenical council in Chalcedon in 451 elevated Jerusalem to a patriarchate and, together with Rome, Alexandria, Antioch, and Constantinpole, it became one of five self-governing centers for Christianity. This elevation greatly boosted the Palestinian church's international prestige.

The Byzantine era was a time of great prosperity and cultural flourishing in Palestine. New areas were cultivated, urbanization increased, and many cities reached their peak populations. Towns increasingly acquired new civic basilicas, porticoed streets with space for shops, and the erection of churches and other religious buildings invigorated their economies. The total population of Palestine may have exceeded one and a half million, its highest ever until the twentieth century.

Caesarea and Gaza became two of the most important centers of learning in the whole Mediterranean region, superseding and replacing those of Alexandria and Athens. Here, Christian scholars produced notable works in the disciplines of rhetoric, historiography, Church history, classicizing history and hagiography. Saint Jerome while working in Jerusalem set out to produce a Latin translation of the Old Testament (Hebrew Bible) directly from the Hebrew text. At that time, all translations were based on the Greek Septuagint, translated in the third century BCE, which Jerome thought was unsatisfactory. His work resulted in the Vulgate which became the Catholic Church's officially promulgated Latin version of the Bible. Eusebius in his topographical work, Onomasticon: On the Place Names in Divine Scripture, attempted to correlate names and places from the biblical narratives with existing localities in Palestine. These works conceptualized the western view of Palestine as a Christian Holy Land.

Starting in the late 3rd century, the Roman provincial administration underwent a series of reforms subdividing the provinces into smaller administrative units. The intent was to circumscribe the ability of provincial governors with strong garrisons to stage revolts against the emperor and to improve efficiency by reducing the area controlled by each governor. Provinces were clustered into regional groups called dioceses. Syria Palaestina became part of Dioceses Orienties, a diocese grouping the near eastern provinces. In the 4th century, Palestine and neighboring regions were reorganized into the provinces Palaestina Prima, Palaestina Secunda, and Palaestina Tertia or Palaestina Salutaris (First, Second, and Third Palestine). Palaestina Prima with its capital in Caesarea encompassed the central parts of Palestine, including the coastal plain, Judea, and Samaria. Palaestina Secunda had its capital in Scythopolis and included northern Transjordan, the lower Jezreel Valley, the Galilee, and the Golan area. Palaestina Tertia with its capital in Petra included the Negev, southern Transjordan, and parts of the Sinai. The three Palestines became part of the Eastern Roman Empire after the split of the Roman Empire in 395.

Jewish communities thrived along the edges of Judah, in northern Palestine, and in many poleis, including Caesarea and Scythopolis. Their share of the population possibly decreased in the Byzantine era but by how much is uncertain. In 351/2, a Jewish revolt in the Galilee may have taken place. In 361, the new Emperor Julian renounced Christianity, embraced polytheism and set out to reverse Christianity's growing influence.  As part of this effort, he ordered the Jewish temple in Jerusalem to be rebuilt. The point was that a new temple would invalidate Jesus' prophecy about its destruction, something Christians saw as proof of Jesus' divinity. However, accidents, sabotage, or an earthquake, together with the re-establishment of Christianity's dominance following the death of Julian in 363 ended the attempt to rebuild the temple. In 438, Jews may have been temporarily allowed to worship in Jerusalem.

The Christian Ghassanid Arabs were the largest Arab group in Palestine. Starting in the third century, they migrated from South Arabia and settled in Palaestina Secunda and Palaestina Tertia, where they created two client kingdoms that served as the Byzantines' buffer zones. The Ghassanids were a source for toops for the Byzantines and fought with them against the Persians and their allies, the Arab Lakhmids.

In 106, the Romans annexed the territory of the Nabataean client kingdom into the province of Arabia Petraea, apparently without bloodshed, but the Nabataeans, who controlled many important trade routes, continued to prosper. The incorporation of the Nabataean kingdom began a slow process of hellenization and after the fourth century Greek replaced Aramaic for formal purposes. Most Nabataeans probably converted to Christianity.

In the late 5th and early 6th century, the Samaritans staged several revolts. The first occurred in 484 and required considerable force to put down. The Samaritans' synagogue on Mt. Gerizim was replaced with a church as punishment. Another uprising took place in 529 when the Samaritans attacked Christians and Jews and burned estates and churches. The revolt was crushed by the Byzantines aided by Christian Ghassanid Arabs, who took thousands of Samaritans as slaves. A third revolt erupted in 556. This time, Jews and Samaritans joined forces against the Christians. Little is known about these revolts, but the probable cause for them was the Byzantines' discrimination against non-Christians. The rebellions and the authorities anti-Samaritan policies caused the Samaritians' numbers to dwindle and contributed to solidifying Christian dominance in Palestine.

In 602, the final war between the Byzantine Empire and its eastern rival the Persian Empire (Sasanid Empire) broke out. In 613 the Persians invaded the Levant and the Jews revolted against the Byzantines, hoping to secure autonomy for Jerusalem. The following year Persian-Jewish forces captured Caesarea and Jerusalem, destroying its churches, massacring its Christian population, and taking the True Cross and other relics as trophies. The Jews gained dominance over Jerusalem, but the Persians found it more expedient to side with the Christians who constituted the overwhelming majority of the population and in 617 the Persians returned the city to them. Meanwhile, the Roman emperor Heraclius began a successful counter-offensive. By 627/8 he was advancing into the Persian heartland. The Persians sued for peace and had to return the Roman provinces they had captured and the stolen relics. In March 629, Heraclius triumphantly returned the True Cross to Jerusalem. Heraclius had promised the Jews pardon for their earlier treachery but the Christians had not forgotten the Jews' atrocities. At their insistence, Heraclius expelled the Jews from Jerusalem and had those involved in the uprising executed.

Although the Romans had soundly defeated their nemesis, the continued warfare had taken its toll and paved the way for the Arabian conquest a decade later.

Early Muslim period

In the late 6th century, a new monotheistic religion called Islam was founded by its prophet Muhammad, whose followers became known as Muslims. Muhammad united the tribes of Arabia into a religious polity, a caliphate, whose domains he and his successors extended into a vast empire through holy war (jihad). They conquered Palestine in 636 to 640.

Society in the caliphate formed a pyramid with five layers. Arabs were at the top, followed by converts to Islam (mawali) (this distinction disappeared after the Abbasids seized power). Below them stood dhimmis, followed by non-Muslim free men and slaves at the bottom. The dhimmi (meaning "protected person") were Christians, Jews, and Samaritans, who the Muslims designated as "peoples of the Book" (ahl al-kitab), meaning that they, like the Muslims, based their worship on a book God had given to them, which, in its essence, was identical to the Koran. Unlike the previous rulers, the Muslims allowed them to practice their religions in peace. However, non-Muslim men had to pay a special tax (jizya) and they had to be submissive to Muslims. Dress regulations were imposed on non-Muslims, but it is uncertain whether they were ever enforced in Palestine. Muslim men were permitted to marry non-Muslim women even if the latter choose to remain in their faith. Muslim women, however, could not marry non-Muslim men, unless they first converted to Islam. The Muslims also lifted the Romans' centuries-long ban on Jews in Jerusalem.

The Muslims organized the territory of the Byzantine Dioceses Orientes (Syria) into five military districts, or provinces (pl. ). The territory of Palaestina Prima and Palaestina Tertia became Jund Filastin and stretched from Aqaba in the south to the lower Galilee in the north and from Arish in the west to Jericho in the east. The Tulunids later expanded the borders of the province eastwards and southwards to include regions in modern-day southern Jordan and north-western Saudi Arabia. The newly founded city Ramla became Jund Filastin's administrative capital and most important city. Jund al-Urdunn corresponded with Palaestina Secunda, covering most of the Galilee, the western part of Peraea in Transjordan, and the coastal cities Acre and Sur (Tyre). Tabariyyah (Tiberias) replaced Scythopolis as the province's capital.

Throughout the period, Palestine was a sort of gold mine for the caliphate and among its most prosperous and fertile provinces. Palestine's wealth derived from its strategic location as a hub for international trade, the influx of pilgrims, its excellent agricultural produce, and from a number of local crafts. Products manufactured or traded in Palestine included building materials from marble and white-stone quarries, spices, soaps, olive oil, sugar, indigo, Dead Sea salts, and silk. Palestinian Jews were expert glassmakers whose wares became known as "Jewish glass" in Europe. Palestine was also known for its book production and scribal work.

The Muslims invested much effort in developing a fleet and in restoring seaports, creating shipyards, fortifying coastal cities, and in establishing naval bases in Palestine. Acre became their chief naval base from which a fleet set out to conquer Cyprus in 647. Jaffa came to replace Caesarea as Palestine's main port due to its proximity with Ramla.

Though Palestine was now under Muslim control, the Christian world's affection for the Holy Land continued to grow. Christian kings made generous donations to Jerusalem's holy sites, and helped facilitate the ever increasing pilgrimage traffic. Pilgrims ventured for the adventure, but also to expiate sin. Many pilgrims were attacked by highwaymen which would later be cited by the Crusaders as a reason to "liberate" Jerusalem from the Muslims.

Umayyad Caliphate 

In 656 the Rashidun caliph Uthman was assassinated leading to the caliphate's first civil war (fitna). The war ended in 661 with the Umayyads becoming the caliphate's ruling dynasty. They moved the caliphate's capital from Kufa to Damascus, where they enjoyed strong tribal support. The religious significance of nearby Jerusalem and the fact that in Syria, unlike in Iraq and Egypt, Arabs and non-Arabs lived together may also have played a role.

The Umayyads built two important Islamic religious buildings on the Temple Mount in Jerusalem; the al-Jami'a al-Aqsa and the Dome of the Rock (Qubbat al-Sakhra). The latter was built on the site where Muslims believe that Mohammad began his nocturnal journey to heaven. Contrary to common belief, the Dome is not a mosque and its original function and significance is uncertain. One theory holds that the Dome's grand scale and lavish decoration were meant to assert Islam's supremacy by rivaling that of Jerusalem's Christian holy buildings, especially the Church of the Holy Sepulchre. Another that its construction was spurred by eschatological beliefs about the Judgement Day. The Dome is the oldest extant Islamic monument in the world.

The centuries-long feud between the Arab tribal confederations the Qays and the Yaman that began under the Umayyads came to color Palestine's history. The feud persisted until the modern era and battles were fought between Qaysi and Yamani groups as late as the nineteenth century. Marriages between the two groups were unheard of. The Yaman tribes purportedly came from the Yemeni region of the Arabian peninsula. Many of them had migrated northwards and settled in the southern Levant before the Islamic conquest. Some had even embraced Christianity and had fought alongside the Byzantines. The majority of the Qays, however, arrived after the Islamic conquest and settled in the northern Levant. This led to territorial conflicts in areas with mixed populations. The early caliphs would seek support from one of these groups and would consequently be opposed by the other, often resulting in warfare. The pretender standing victorious in these wars would reward their confederation with governorships in the provinces and other privileges. The casualties inflicted during the wars would also have to be avenged, causing further bloodshed. Later caliphs tried to curb the feud, but it was almost impossible to stop; the best that they could do was to keep it under control by threats and themselves paying the blood-money demanded to prevent further retaliation.

In 744, Palestinian tribes rebelled against the caliph. The caliph appeased the tribes by promising them various offices and other benefits. While it ended the rebellion, the tribes remained antagonistic towards the caliph. One of the reasons for their antagonism was that the caliph considered their heavy-handed collection of jizya from the non-Muslims to be extortionist and he demanded more leniency. Another uprising broke out in Syria in 745 after Marwan II had become the new caliph and was soon joined by the Palestinian tribes. Marwan II quelled the uprising but another erupted which required considerable bloodshed to stamp out. Marwan II destroyed the city walls of Jerusalem, Damascus, and other cities as punishment.

Abbasid Caliphate 

The Umayyads' conquests meant that most of the caliphate's population was non-Arab. Many of them converted to Islam, but were treated as second-class Muslims by the Arabs and still had to pay the burdensome jizya tax. This led to widespread discontent and hostility towards the Umayyads. The Abbasid family exploited the discontent and organized a rebellion, overthrowing the Umayyads in 750. The Abbasids, who had their power base in Persia, moved the caliphate's capital to Baghdad in 762. This change meant that Palestine lost its central position and became a province in the caliphate's periphery whose problems weren't tended to very carefully. Though it did not cause a decline in the region, it ended the Umayyads' extravagant investments in Palestine. The prestige of the tribes in Syria, including Palestine, many of whom had supported the Umayyads also diminished and they no longer influenced the caliphate's political affairs – only its rebellions.

Rebellions and other disturbances constantly troubled the Abbasids' rule. In the 790s, the Qays-Yaman feud resulted in several wars in Palestine. One of these, fought in 796 between Qaysi rebels on one side, and the Yamani and Abbasid regime on the other, required substantial force to quell. Another uprising broke out in the 840s when the Yaman Al-Mubarqa roused peasants and tribesmen against the Abbasid regime. These outburts of violence were very destructive and the rebels caused great havoc, looted monasteries, and devastated many cities. At times, Palestine was a lawless land.

Towards the end of the 9th century, the Abbasids began to lose control of their western provinces, following a period of internal instability. In 873, the governor of Egypt, Ahmad Ibn Tulun, declared independence and founded the Tulunid dynasty. A few years later, he occupied Syria. The Tulunids ended the persecution of Christians and prompted the renovation of churches in Jerusalem. The port of Acre was also renovated. The Tulunids' rule was short-lived, however, and by 906 the Abbasids had retaken Palestine. Their control lasted until 939 when they granted Muhammad ibn Tughj al-Ikhshid, the governor of Egypt and Palestine, autonomous control over his domain. He established the Ikshidid dynasty whose rule was marked by acts of persecution against Christians, sometimes aided by local Jews. In 937, the Church of the Resurrection was torched and robbed and in 966 severe anti-Christian riots occurred in Jerusalem. Anarchy reigned after the Ikhshidid regent died in 968. Many welcomed the Fatimid Caliphate's conquest of the Ikhshid state the following year.

Fatimid Caliphate

The Fatimidis established a caliphate based in North Africa in the early 10th century. In 969, they conquered the Ikshidid's territory and established precarious control over Palestine. Their arrival marked the beginning of six decades of almost uninterrupted and highly destructive warfare in Palestine between them and their many enemies, the Byzantines, the Qarmatians, Bedouin tribes, and even infighting between Berber and Turkic factions within the Fatimid army. Of note are the Bedouins, led by the Jarrahids, who in 977-981/2, in 1011–13, and in 1024–1029, gained de facto independent rule over most of Palestine, either by rebelling or by acquiring the Caliph's reluctant consent. The Bedouins also enjoyed almost unlimited power in Palestine in 997–1010. The Bedouins' rule, plunder and many atrocities exacted a heavy toll on Palestine.

In 1009, in a spate of religious persecution, Caliph Al-Hakim bi-Amr Allah ordered the demolition of all churches and synagogues in the empire, including the Church of the Holy Sepulchre. News of the demolition shocked and enraged Christian Europe which blamed the Jews. Al-Hakim also forced Christians and Jews to wear a distinctive dress. His anti-Christian policies may have been intended to mollify critics of his father's liberal attitude towards dhimmi or to put pressure on the Byzantines. His successor permitted the holy church to be rebuilt, but the repression against non-Muslims continued.

In the 11th century, the Muslim Turkic Seljuk Empire invaded West Asia and both the Byzantines and the caliphates suffered territorial losses. Baghad fell in 1055, and Palestine in 1071-1073. Thus, the period of relative calm ended and Palestine again became the scene of anarchy, internal wars among the Turks themselves and between them and their enemies. The Turkic rule was one of slaughter, vandalism, and economic hardship. In 1077, an uprising against the unpopular Seljuk rule spread in Palestine which was quashed with an iron fist. The Seljuks slaughtered the people of Jerusalem, despite having promised them pardon, and annihilated Gaza, Ramla, and Jaffa. In 1098, the Fatimids recaptured Jerusalem from the Seljuks.

In addition to the warring, three major earthquakes hit Palestine in the 11th century: in 1015, in 1033, and 1068. The last one virtually demolished Ramla and killed some 15,000 inhabitants.

Crusader period

Generally, the Crusades (1095–1291) refer to the European Christian campaigns in the Holy Land sponsored by the Papacy against Muslims in order to reconquer the region of Palestine. While Palestine was a far away land, pilgrimage had nurtured a special bond between the region and the Europeans who considered it a holy land. Impediments to the pilgrimage traffic to Palestine, of which there were many in the late 11th century, were cause for serious concern. Meanwhile, a doctrine of holy war developed under which warfare to aid Christians or to defend Christianity was seen as virtuous. Additionally, relations between the Eastern and Western branches of Christianity – which had been chilly schisms – were improving. These factors meant that when the Byzantines called for help against the Muslims, the western Europeans obliged and launched the first of a number of military expeditions, known as "the Crusades".

The First Crusade captured the entire eastern Mediterranean coast, from modern-day Turkey in the north to the Sinai in the south. Crusader states were organized in the captured territory, one of which was the Kingdom of Jerusalem, founded in 1100, encompassing most of Palestine and modern-day Lebanon. More crusades followed as the Latins and the Muslims battled for control over Palestine.

In 1187, Palestine, including Jerusalem, was captured by the Egyptian-based Ayyubid dynasty. However, the Ayyubids failed to take Tyre and the crusader states in the north. This allowed the crusaders to launch another crusade that by 1192 had occupied most of the Palestinian coast down to Jaffa, but, crucially, it failed to retake Jerusalem. Negotiations between the Latins and the Ayyubids resulted in a treaty, securing unfettered access to the Church of the Holy Sepulchre in Jerusalem for Christian pilgrims, but the holy city would remain in Ayyubid hands and the True Cross would not be returned.

This state of affairs, with the Kingdom of Jerusalem reduced to a sliver of coastal land, would remain for most of the 13th century. Jerusalem, Bethlehem, and Nazareth, as well as a thin strip of land connecting the cities to the coast, was awarded the kingdom in 1229 following negotiations that concluded the Sixth Crusade. Ten years earlier, the Ayyubids had destroyed Jerusalem's city walls to prevent the Latins from capturing a fortified city. In 1244, Jerusalem was captured by Khwarizmians who went on to burn churches and to massacre the Christian population. The shock of the atrocities goaded the Latins into action. The Latin nobility pooled all the resources they had together into the largest field army amassed in the East since the late 12 century. Strengthened by troops from dissident Muslim rulers, they met the Ayyubid–Khwarizmian coalition at the Battle of La Forbie north-east of Gaza. There, they suffered a disastrous defeat, marking the end of Latin influence in southern and central Palestine. In 1291, the Mamluks destroyed Acre, the Kingdom of Jerusalem's capital and last stronghold.

The Europeans interest in crusading gradually waned over time. New ideas about what a "good Christian life" meant emerged and seeking redemption for sins through action became less central. To boot, "heretical" beliefs within Europe became a major issue for Latin Christianity, taking focus away from Palestine.

Military orders made up of pious knights, combining monastic discipline with martial skill, were organized in the crusader states. The duties of these were to defend strategic areas and to serve in the crusader armies. The most famous orders was the Knights Templar, named after their headquarter in the al-Aqsa mosque which they called the Temple of Solomon. The nearby Dome of the Rock was used as a church. Another famous order were the Hospitallers, renowned for caring for the poor and sick. In Palestine, where crusades came and went, the orders provided stability otherwise impossible to maintain.

Under the Crusader rule, fortifications, castles, towers and fortified villages were built, rebuilt and renovated across Palestine largely in rural areas. A notable urban remnant of the Crusader architecture of this era is found in Acre's old city.

During the period of Crusader control, it has been estimated that Palestine had only 1,000 poor Jewish families. Jews fought alongside the Muslims against the Crusaders in Jerusalem in 1099 and Haifa in 1100.

Ayyubid and Mamluk periods

The Ayyubids allowed Jewish and Orthodox Christian settlement in the region, and the Dome of the Rock was converted back into an Islamic center of worship. The Mosque of Omar was built under Saladin outside the Church of the Holy Sepulchre, commemorating Umar the Great's decision to pray outside the church so as not to set a precedent and thereby endanger the church's status as a Christian site.

The Mamluk Sultanate was indirectly created in Egypt as a result of the Seventh Crusade, which had been launched in reaction to the 1244 destruction of Jerusalem. The crusade failed after Louis IX of France was defeated and captured by Ayyubid Sultan Turanshah at the Battle of Fariskur in 1250. Turanshah was killed by his Mamluk soldiers a month after the battle and his step-mother Shajar al-Durr became Sultana of Egypt with the Mamluk Aybak as Atabeg. The Ayyubids relocated to Damascus, where they continued to control Palestine for a further 10 years.

In the late 13th century, Palestine and Syria became the primary front against the fast-expanding Mongol Empire, whose army reached Palestine for the first time in 1260, beginning with the Mongol raids into Palestine under Nestorian Christian general Kitbuqa. Mongol leader Hulagu Khan sent a message to Louis IX of France that Jerusalem had been remitted to the Christians under the Franco-Mongol Alliance; however, shortly thereafter he had to return to Mongolia following the death of Mongke, leaving Kitbuqa and a reduced army. Kitbuqa then engaged with the Mamluks under Baibars in the pivotal Battle of Ain Jalut in the Jezreel Valley. The Mamluks' decisive victory in Palestine is seen as one of world history's most significant battles, establishing a high-water mark for the Mongol conquests. The Mongols were, however, able to engage into some further brief raids in 1300 under Ghazan and Mulay, reaching as far as Gaza. Jerusalem was held by the Mongols for four months (see Ninth Crusade).

The Mamluks, continuing the policy of the Ayyubids, made the strategic decision to destroy the coastal area and to bring desolation to many of its cities, from Tyre in the north to Gaza in the south. Ports were destroyed and various materials were dumped to make them inoperable. The goal was to prevent attacks from the sea, given the fear of the return of the crusaders. This had a long-term effect on those areas, which remained sparsely populated for centuries. The activity in that time concentrated more inland.

Palestine formed a part of the Damascus Wilayah (district) under the rule of the Mamluk Sultanate of Egypt and was divided into three smaller sanjaks (subdivisions) with capitals in Jerusalem, Gaza, and Safed. Due in part to the many conflicts, earthquakes and the Black Death that hit the region during this era, the population is estimated to have dwindled to around 200,000. The Mamluks constructed a "postal road" from Cairo to Damascus, that included lodgings for travelers (khans) and bridges, some of which survive to this day (see Jisr Jindas, near Lod). The period also saw the construction of many schools and the renovation of mosques neglected or destroyed during the Crusader period.

In 1377 the major cities of Palestine and Syria revolted, following the death of Al-Ashraf Sha'ban. The revolt was quelled and a coup d'etat was staged by Barquq in Cairo in 1382, founding the Mamluk Burji dynasty.

Palestine was celebrated by Arab and Muslim writers of the time as the "blessed land of the prophets and Islam's revered leaders". Muslim sanctuaries were "rediscovered" and received many pilgrims. In 1496, Mujir al-Din al-'Ulaymi wrote his history of Palestine known as The Glorious History of Jerusalem and Hebron.

Ottoman period

Early Ottoman rule

In 1486, hostilities broke out between the Mamluks and the Ottoman Turks in a battle for control over western Asia. The Ottomans proceeded to conquer Palestine following their 1516 victory over the Mamluks at the Battle of Marj Dabiq. The Ottoman conquest of Palestine was relatively swift, with small battles fought against the Mamluks in the Jordan Valley and at Khan Yunis en route to the Mamluk capital in Egypt. There were also minor uprisings in Gaza, Ramla and Safad, which were quickly suppressed.

The Ottomans maintained the administrative and political organisation that the Mamluks left in Palestine. Greater Syria became an eyalet (province) ruled from Damascus, while the Palestine region within it was divided into the five sanjaks (provincial districts, also called liwa′ in Arabic) of Safad, Nablus, Jerusalem, Lajjun and Gaza. The sanjaks were further subdivided into subdistricts called nawahi (sing. nahiya). For much of the 16th century, the Ottomans ruled Damascus Eyalet in a centralised way, with the Istanbul-based Sublime Porte (imperial government) playing a crucial role in maintaining public order and domestic security, collecting taxes, and regulating the economy, religious affairs and social welfare. Most of Palestine's population, estimated to be around 200,000 in the early years of Ottoman rule, lived in villages. The largest cities were Gaza, Safad and Jerusalem, each with a population of around 5,000–6,000.

Ottoman property administration consisted of a system of fiefs called timar and trusts called waqf. Timar lands were distributed by the sultan to various officers and officials, particularly from the elite sipahi units. A timar was a source of income for its holder, who was responsible for maintaining order and enforcing the law in the timar. Waqf land was owned by various individuals and its revenues were dedicated to religious functions and institutions, social welfare and individual beneficiaries. Over 60% of cultivated land in the Jerusalem Sanjak was waqf land. To a lesser extent, there was also privately owned land predominantly located within villages and their immediate vicinity.

The name "Palestine" was no longer used as the official name of an administrative unit under the Ottomans because they typically named provinces after their capitals. Nonetheless, the old name remained in popular and semi-official use, with many examples of its usage in the 16th, 17th and 18th centuries surviving. The 16th-century Jerusalem-based Islamic jurist Sayf al-Islam Abu'l Sa'ud Effendi defined the term as an alternative name for Arazi-i Muqaddas (Turkish for "the Holy Land"). The 17th-century Ramla-based jurist Khayr al-Din al-Ramli often used the term "Filastin" in his fatawat (religious edicts) without defining the term, although some of his fatawat suggest that it more or less corresponded with the borders of Jund Filastin. Thomas Salmon's 18th-century book, Modern history or, the present state of all nations, states that "Jerusalem is still reckoned the capital city of Palestine, though much fallen from its ancient grandeur."

Decentralization process

Ridwan-Farrukh-Turabay period
By the end of the 16th century, direct Ottoman rule over Damascus Eyalet was weakened, partly due to the Jelali revolts and other Anatolian insurrections. The timar system, which functioned to serve the fiscal and military needs of the Ottoman government, was also becoming less relevant during this period. Consequently, a new governing elite emerged in Palestine consisting of the Ridwan, Farrukh and Turabay dynasties whose members provided the district governors of the Gaza, Nablus, Jerusalem and Lajjun sanjaks between the late 16th century and the late 17th century. The stability of their rule varied by sanjak, with Ridwan control of Gaza, Turabay control of Lajjun, and Farrukh control of Nablus largely continuous, and the Ridwan-Farrukh hold over Jerusalem frequently interrupted by governors appointed from Istanbul.

Ties between the families were solidified through inter-marriage, business and political cooperation. From the late 16th century until the early 18th century, the prestigious post of amir al-hajj (commander of the Hajj caravan) would often be assigned to the district governor of Nablus or Gaza. This tradition laid the foundation for a durable military alliance between the three families since the departing amir al-hajj from one of these families would entrust authority over his sanjak to the governor of the neighboring sanjak. Gradually, the ties between the Ridwan, Farrukh and Turabay families led to the establishment of a single extended dynasty that held sway over much of Palestine.

In 1622, the Druze emir (prince) of Mount Lebanon, Fakhr-al-Din II gained control of Safad Sanjak and was appointed governor of Nablus and mutasallim (chief tax collector) of Gaza. Alarmed at the looming threat to their rule, the Ridwan-Farrukh-Turabay alliance prepared for a confrontation with Fakhr ad-Din by pooling their financial resources to acquire arms and bribe Bedouin tribes to fight alongside them. They were also tacitly supported by the Sublime Porte, which was wary of Fakhr ad-Din's growing autonomy. When Fakhr ad-Din's better-equipped army launched an offensive to gain control of Palestine's coastal plain and Jerusalem, the army of Hasan Arab Ridwan, Ahmad Turabay and Muhammad ibn Farrukh routed his forces at the Awja River near Jaffa. In 1624, following the Battle of Anjar, Fakhr ad-Din was appointed the "Emir of Arabistan" by the Ottomans, which gave him official authority over the region between Aleppo and Jerusalem. He was deposed and hanged a decade later by the Wali of Damascus.

Imperial attempts at centralization
Gaza's political influence in Palestine rose under the Ridwan dynasty, particularly during the governorship of Husayn Pasha, which began in the 1640s. It was considered the "capital of Palestine" by the French consul of Jerusalem, Chevalier d'Arvieux. Husayn's closeness with France and his good relations with Palestine's Christian communities were a source of imperial consternation at his rule. Concurrently, in the mid-17th century, the Ottoman government guided by the Köprülü viziers attempted to restore centralized authority over its outlier provinces. One of the centralization measures introduced by Grand Vizier Köprülü Mehmed Pasha was the establishment of the Sidon Eyalet in 1660, which administratively separated Safad Sanjak from the rest of Palestine, which remained part of Damascus Eyalet. This reorganization was done to both weaken the ambitious governors of Damascus and to maintain stricter control over the rebellious emirs of Mount Lebanon.

With the elimination of Fakhr ad-Din's threat to Ottoman control in the Levant, the Sublime Porte sought to bring an end to the Ridwan-Farrukh-Turabay dynasty. Beside concern over their increasing consolidation of power in Palestine, the Sublime Porte was frustrated by the substantially decreased revenues from the annual Hajj caravan, which a governor from one of the three families often commanded. In 1657, the Ottoman authorities launched a military expedition in Palestine to reassert imperial control over the region because of its strategic importance in the funding and protection of the Hajj caravan and also because it was a crucial link to Egypt. The Sublime Porte used Husayn Pasha's alleged incompetence leading the Hajj caravan in 1662–63 to imprison and execute him. Husayn Pasha served as the foundation of the Ridwan-Farrukh-Turabay alliance and his death was followed by the Sublime Porte's gradual elimination of the rest of the extended dynasty by the late 1670s. Ridwan rule persisted in Gaza until 1690.

The elimination of the Ridwan-Farrukh-Turabay dynasty and their replacement by governors appointed by the Ottoman government "radically changed the state of affairs" in Palestine, according to historian Dror Ze'evi. The appointed governors abandoned the relationships that the local dynasties maintained with the local elites and largely ignored the increasing exploitation of the populace by the Janissaries, subashis and timar holders. Official complaints to the Sublime Porte about the latter groups skyrocketed among Muslims, Christians and Jews alike. Many peasants abandoned their villages to avoid exploitation, townspeople complained about the seizure of their property and the ulama (Muslim scholarly class) complained about the Janissaries' disregard for justice and the sanctity of Muslim places of worship, including the Temple Mount (Haram al-Sharif). In reaction to this state of affairs, in 1703, an uprising, known as the Naqib al-Ashraf Revolt, by the people of Jerusalem took place, led by the chief of the ashraf families, Muhammad ibn Mustafa al-Husayni, and backed by the city's notables. The home of Jerusalem's qadi, a symbol of imperial authority, was ransacked and his translator killed by rebels. They proceeded to govern the city themselves until an Ottoman siege and internal strife forced al-Husayni and his rebels to withdraw from Jerusalem in October 1705.

Meanwhile, the mostly Arab sipahi officers of the 1657 centralization expedition, chief among them members of the Nimr family, settled in Nablus and, contrary to the Sublime Porte's intention, began forming their own local power bases in the city's rural hinterland from the timars they were assigned. Towards the end of the 17th century, they were soon followed by the Jarrar and Tuqan families, who like the Nimrs, came from other parts of Ottoman Syria. The sheikhs (chiefs) of these families soon emerged as the new nobility of central Palestine. They developed increasingly close ties to the local population through selling or leasing their timars to rural notables, investing in local commerce, property and businesses such as soap factories, and intermarrying and partnering with local ashraf and mercantile families. Politically, the Tuqans and Nimrs dominated the governorship of Nablus and at times controlled other districts and subdistricts (in 1723 Salih Pasha Tuqan was governor of the Nablus, Lajjun and Gaza sanjaks). The Jarrars were the dominant clan of the Nablus hinterland, although other clans, among them the Mamluk-era Jayyusis, continued to hold influence in their respective subdistricts. This state of affairs in Jabal Nablus persisted with minor interruptions until the mid-19th century.

Rule of Acre and autonomy of Nablus

Zaydani period

In the mid-17th century, the Zaydani family became a formidable force in northern Palestine. Initially, its sheikhs were appointed as multazems (tax collectors and local enforcers) of iltizam (tax farms) in parts of the Galilee by the Ma'ani, and, after 1697, the Shihabi emirs of Mount Lebanon. In 1730, Zaydani sheikh Zahir al-Umar was directly appointed by the Wali of Sidon as the multazem of Tiberias, which he soon fortified, along with other Zaydani strongholds such as Deir Hanna, Arraba and Nazareth. Between that time and 1750, Zahir had consolidated his control over the entire Galilee. He transferred his headquarters to the port village of Acre, which he renovated and refortified. Acre became the center of an expanding autonomous sheikhdom financed by a monopoly on cotton and other agricultural commodities from Palestine and southern Lebanon established by Zahir. Zahir's control of cotton and olive oil prices drew great revenues from European merchants, and these funds enabled him to marshal military resources needed to fend off military assaults by the governors of Damascus. Moreover, the monopolies ended the foreign merchants' manipulation of prices and financial exploitation of the local peasantry. Together with significantly improved general security and social justice, Zahir's economic policies made him popular with the local inhabitants. Zahir also encouraged immigration to Palestine and his rule attracted large numbers of Jews and Melkite and Greek Orthodox Christians from throughout Ottoman Syria, revitalizing the region's economy. Zahir founded modern-day Haifa in 1769.

In the early 1770s, Zahir allied himself with the Russian Empire and Ali Bey of Egypt. Together with Ali Bey's deputy commanders Ismail Bey and Abu al-Dhahab, and backed by the Russian Navy, Zahir and his Lebanese Shia allies invaded Damascus and Sidon. Ali Bey's commanders abruptly withdrew from Damascus after briefly capturing it in June 1771, compelling Zahir to withdraw from Sidon shortly thereafter. Uthman Pasha al-Kurji, the Wali of Damascus, renewed his campaign to eliminate Zahir, but his forces were routed at Lake Hula in September 1771. Zahir followed up this decisive victory with another major victory against Emir Yusuf Shihab's Druze forces at Nabatieh. By 1774, Zahir's rule extended from Gaza to Beirut and included most of Palestine. The year after, however, a coalition of Ottoman forces besieged and killed him at his Acre headquarters. The Ottoman commander Jazzar Pasha subsequently waged a campaign that destroyed Deir Hanna's fort and ended Zaydani rule in the Galilee in 1776.

Although Acre and the Galilee were part of Sidon Eyalet while the rest of Palestine administratively belonged to Damascus, it was the rulers of Acre, beginning with Zahir, that dominated Palestine and the southern Syrian districts. Damascus governors typically held office for short periods of time and were often occupied with protecting and leading the Hajj caravan (the office of amir al-hajj had become the responsibility of the Wali of Damascus in 1708), preventing them from asserting their authority over semi-autonomous areas such as the Nablus region. In contrast, Zahir established Acre as a virtually autonomous entity, a process seen in other parts of the Ottoman Empire including Egypt, Mount Lebanon and Mosul. Moreover, Acre became the de facto capital of Sidon Eyalet during and after Zahir's reign, and like Zahir, his successors ruled Acre until their deaths. There were several military confrontations between Zahir and the Jarrar clan starting in 1735 when the former occupied the latter's territory of Nazareth and the Jezreel Valley, which served as trade and transportation hubs. Meanwhile, in 1766, the Tuqan family had ousted the Jayyusis from the Bani Sa'b subdistrict, which was then occupied by Zahir in 1771, stripping Nablus of its sea access. The conflict between Zahir and the Tuqans culminated with the former's unsuccessful siege of Nablus later that year.

Jazzari period

Jazzar Pasha was appointed Wali of Sidon by the Sublime Porte for his role in uprooting the Zaydani sheikhdom. Unlike the Galilee-born Zahir, Jazzar was a product of the Ottoman state and a force for Ottoman centralization, yet he also pursued his own agenda, extending his influence throughout the southern half of Ottoman Syria. Jazzar assumed control over Zahir's cotton monopoly and further strengthened the fortifications of Acre, where he was based. He financed his rule through income generated from the cotton trade, as well as taxes, tolls and extortion. Tensions between Jazzar and the French cotton merchants of Acre ended with the latter being expelled in the late 1780s, at a time when prices for Palestine's cotton were declining due to alternative sources elsewhere. Like Zahir, Jazzar was able to maintain domestic security by suppressing the Bedouin tribes. However, the local peasantry did not fare well under his stringent taxation policies, which resulted in many leaving the Galilee for neighboring areas. To protect his rule, he raised a personal army of mamluks (slave soldiers) and mercenaries consisting of troops from different parts of the Islamic world. Jazzar established close ties with the Tuqan family, who were traditionally aligned with the Ottoman authorities. However, the Tuqans' chief rival, the Jarrar family, resisted his attempts at centralization and Jazzar besieged them at their Sanur fortress in 1790 and 1795, both times ending in defeat.

In February 1799, Emperor Napoleon of France entered Palestine after conquering Egypt as part of his campaign against the Ottomans, who were allied with his enemy, the British Empire. He occupied Gaza and moved north along Palestine's coastal plain, capturing Jaffa, where his forces massacred some 3,000 Ottoman troops who had surrendered and many civilians. His forces then captured Haifa and used it as a staging ground for their siege of Acre. Napoleon called for Jewish support to capture Jerusalem. This was done to gain favor with Haim Farhi, Jazzar's Jewish vizier. The invasion rallied the sheikhs of Jabal Nablus, with the multazem of Jenin, Sheikh Yusuf al-Jarrar, beckoning them to combat the French. In contrast to the sheikhs of the Hebron Hills and Jerusalem who provided conscripts to the Ottoman Army, the sheikhs of Jabal Nablus fought independently, to the chagrin of the Sublime Porte. Their men were defeated by the French in the Galilee. Napoleon failed to conquer Acre and his defeat by Jazzar's forces, backed by the British, compelled him to withdraw from Palestine with heavy losses in May. Jazzar's victory significantly boosted his prestige. The Ottomans pursued the French in Egypt in 1800, using Gaza as their launch point.

Jazzar died in 1804 and was succeeded as Wali of Sidon by his trusted mamluk Sulayman Pasha al-Adil. Sulayman, under Farhi's guidance, undertook a policy of loosening his predecessors' monopolies on the cotton, olive oil and grain trades. However, he also established Acre as the only Levantine port city allowed to export these cash crops. He also made significant cuts to Acre's military and adopted a decentralization policy of non-interference with his deputy governors, such as Muhammad Abu-Nabbut of Jaffa, and diplomacy with various autonomous sheikhs, such as Musa Bey Tuqan of Nablus. This marked a departure from the violent approach of Jazzar. By 1810, Sulayman was appointed to Damascus Eyalet, giving him control over most of Ottoman Syria. Before he was dismissed from the latter in 1812, he managed to have the sanjaks of Latakia, Tripoli and Gaza annexed to Sidon Eyalet. Towards the end of his rule, in 1817, a civil war broke out in Jabal Nablus between the Tuqans and a coalition of the Nimr, Jarrar, Qasim and Abd al-Hadi families over Musa Bey's attempt to monopolize power in Nablus by ousting the Nimrs. Sulayman mediated between the families and secured a temporary peace in 1818.

Abdullah Pasha, groomed by Farhi for leadership, succeeded Sulayman in 1820 nine months after the latter's death in 1819. Ottoman hesitation to appoint Abdullah was mitigated after persistent lobbying and bribery of Ottoman imperial officials by Farhi. Unlike Jazzar's mamluks who sought the governorship, Farhi did not view his protégé Abdullah to be a threat to his influence. Nonetheless, Abdullah had Farhi executed less than a year into his rule as the result of a power struggle. Abdullah more or less continued his predecessor's alliance with Emir Bashir Shihab II of Mount Lebanon and together they confronted the Wali of Damascus. The Ottoman authorities, instigated by Farhi's relatives, attempted to oust Abdullah in a siege against Acre, but Muhammad Ali, Wali of Egypt, persuaded the Ottomans to keep Abdullah as governor. In 1830, the Sidon Eyalet was assigned the sanjaks of Nablus, Jerusalem and Hebron, thereby bringing all of Palestine under a single province. That year, the Jarrars led a revolt against Abdullah, who thereafter besieged and destroyed Sanur's fortress, which had successfully resisted sieges by his predecessors. Abdullah's rule was marked by declining revenues from the cotton trade, efforts to reassert Acre's monopolies and poverty in Palestine. Nonetheless, Acre under Abdullah remained the principal force in Ottoman Syria due to instability in Damascus and the Ottomans' preoccupation with the war in Greece.

Centralization

Egyptian period
In October 1831, Muhammad Ali of Egypt dispatched his modernized army commanded by his son Ibrahim Pasha in a campaign to annex Ottoman Syria, including Palestine. Ibrahim Pasha's forces had previously defeated the Ottomans and gained control of Sudan and the western Arabian Peninsula. Their entry into Palestine was not resisted by the local inhabitants, nor by the rural sheikhs of the central highlands. However, Abdullah Pasha resisted the conquest from Acre, which was besieged and ultimately surrendered in May 1832.

Egyptian rule brought on major political and administrative reforms to Palestine and Ottoman Syria in general, and represented a radical change from the semi-autonomous rule that existed in the region prior to Muhammad Ali's conquest. Among the significant measures established by Ibrahim Pasha to bring all of Syria under a single administration was the introduction of the advisory councils whose purpose was to standardize the diverse political configurations of Syria. The councils, based in the major cities, were composed of religious leaders, wealthy merchants and urban leaders, and functioned as administrative centers. In effect, they solidified urban control and economic domination of the hinterland, according to historian Beshara Doumani. Ibrahim Pasha also instituted the disarmament and conscription of the peasantry, a policy carried out by Muhammad Ali in Egypt to establish centralized rule and a modern army.

Conscription and disarmament were highly unpopular among the peasantry and their leaders, who refused to implement the orders. New taxation policies also threatened the role of urban notables and rural sheikhs as mutasallims, while Egypt's effective law enforcement measures threatened the livelihood of Bedouin tribes who derived their income from extorting merchants and travelers. The diverse array of social and political groups hostile to Egyptian reforms throughout Palestine developed into a coalition. Consequently, this coalition launched what became known as the Peasants' Revolt in 1834. The core of the rebels were based in Jabal Nablus and led by subdistrict chief Qasim al-Ahmad, who had previously contributed peasant irregulars to Ibrahim Pasha's forces during the conquest of Syria. The revolt represented a major threat to the flow of arms and conscripts between Egypt and Syria and to Muhammad Ali's program of modernizing Egypt. Rebel forces captured most of Palestine, including Jerusalem, by June. However, Muhammad Ali arrived in Palestine, opened negotiations with various rebel leaders and sympathizers, and secured a truce in July. He also managed to secure the defection of the powerful Abu Ghosh clan of Jerusalem's hinterland from the rebel forces.

During the truce period, numerous religious and political leaders from Jerusalem and other cities were either arrested, exiled or executed. Afterward, Qasim recommenced the rebellion, viewing the truce as a ruse. Egyptian forces launched a campaign to defeat the rebels in Jabal Nablus, destroying 16 villages before capturing Nablus itself on 15 July. Qasim was pursued to Hebron, which was leveled in August, and was later captured and executed with most of the rebel leadership. In the wake of Egypt's victory, the virtual autonomy of Jabal Nablus was significantly weakened, the conscription orders were carried out with 10,000 peasant conscripts sent to Egypt, and the population was largely disarmed. The latter measure effectively introduced a monopoly of violence in Palestine, as part of Egypt's centralization policies. Egyptian rule and the defeat of the powerful rural sheikhs of Jabal Nablus led to the political elevation of the Abd al-Hadi family of Arraba. Its sheikh, Husayn Abd al-Hadi, supported Ibrahim Pasha during the revolt and was promoted as the Wali of Sidon, which included all of Palestine. His relatives and allies were appointed the mutasallims of Jerusalem, Nablus and Jaffa.

Britain sent the navy to shell Beirut and an Anglo-Ottoman expeditionary force landed, causing local uprisings against the Egyptian occupiers. A British naval squadron anchored off Alexandria. The Egyptian army retreated to Egypt. Muhammad Ali signed the Treaty of 1841. Britain returned control of the Levant to the Ottomans, and as a result was able to increase the extraterritorial rights that various European nations had enjoyed throughout previous centuries under the terms of the Capitulations of the Ottoman Empire. One American diplomat wrote that "Extraordinary privileges and immunities had become so embodied in successive treaties between the great Christian Powers and the Sublime Porte that for most intents and purposes many nationalities in the Ottoman Empire formed a state within the state."

Restoration of Ottoman control
In common usage from 1840 onward, "Palestine" was used either to describe the consular jurisdictions of the Western powers or for a region that extended in the north–south direction typically from Rafah (south-east of Gaza) to the Litani River (now in Lebanon). The western boundary was the sea, and the eastern boundary was the poorly defined place where the Syrian desert began. In various European sources, the eastern boundary was placed anywhere from the Jordan River to slightly east of Amman. The Negev Desert was not included. The Consuls were originally magistrates who tried cases involving their own citizens in foreign territories. While the jurisdictions in the secular states of Europe had become territorial, the Ottomans perpetuated the legal system they inherited from the Byzantine Empire. The law in many matters was personal, not territorial, and the individual citizen carried his nation's law with him wherever he went. Capitulatory law applied to foreigners in Palestine. Only Consular Courts of the State of the foreigners concerned were competent to try them. That was true, not only in cases involving personal status, but also in criminal and commercial matters. According to American Ambassador Morgenthau, Turkey had never been an independent sovereignty. The Western Powers had their own courts, marshals, colonies, schools, postal systems, religious institutions, and prisons. The Consuls also extended protections to large communities of Jewish protégés who had settled in Palestine.

The Muslim, Christian, and Jewish communities of Palestine were allowed to exercise jurisdiction over their own members according to charters granted to them. For centuries the Jews and Christians had enjoyed a large degree of communal autonomy in matters of worship, jurisdiction over personal status, taxes, and in managing their schools and charitable institutions. In the 19th century those rights were formally recognized as part of the Tanzimat reforms and when the communities were placed under the protection of European public law.

In the 1860s, the Ottoman military was able to restore order east of Jordan by halting tribal conflicts and Bedouin raids. This invited migration to the east, notably the Salt area, from various populations in Lebanon, Syria and Palestine to take advantage of new lands. This influx amounted to some 12,000 over the period from 1880 to just before the First World War, while the Bedouin population east of Jordan increased to 56,000. However, with the creation of the Transjordanian emirate in 1921–22, the hamlet of Amman, which had been recently resettled by Circassians, attracted most of the new immigrants from Palestine, and many of those that had previously moved to Salt.

In the reorganisation of 1873, which established the administrative boundaries that remained in place until 1914, Palestine was split between three major administrative units. The northern part, above a line connecting Jaffa to north Jericho and the Jordan, was assigned to the vilayet of Beirut, subdivided into the sanjaks (districts) of Acre, Beirut and Nablus. The southern part, from Jaffa downwards, was part of the Mutasarrifate of Jerusalem, a special district under the direct authority of Istanbul. Its southern boundaries were unclear but petered out in the eastern Sinai Peninsula and northern Negev Desert. Most of the central and southern Negev was assigned to the vilayet of Hejaz, which also included the Sinai Peninsula and the western part of Arabia.

The Ottomans regarded "Filistin" as an abstract term referring to the "Holy Land", and not one consistently applied to a clearly defined area. Among the educated Arab public, Filastin was a common concept, referring either to the whole of Palestine or to the Jerusalem sanjak alone or just to the area around Ramle. The publication of the daily paper Falastin (Palestine) from 1911 was one example of the increasing currency of this concept.

The rise of Zionism, the national movement of the Jewish people started in Europe in the 19th century seeking to recreate a Jewish state in Palestine, and return the original homeland of the Jewish people. The end of the 19th century saw the beginning of Zionist immigration. The "First Aliyah" was the first modern widespread wave of aliyah. Jews who migrated to Palestine in this wave came mostly from Eastern Europe and from Yemen. This wave of aliyah began in 1881–82 and lasted until 1903, bringing an estimated 25,000 Jews to Land of Israel. In 1891, a group of Jerusalem notables sent a petition to the central Ottoman government in Istanbul calling for the cessation of Jewish immigration, and land sales to Jews. The "Second Aliyah" took place between 1904 and 1914, during which approximately 35,000 Jews immigrated, mostly from Russia and Poland,

Great War and interregnum

During the First World War the Ottomans sided with the German Empire and the Central Powers. As a result, they were driven from much of the region by the British Empire during the dissolution phase of the Ottoman Empire.

Under the secret Sykes–Picot Agreement of 1916, it was envisioned that most of Palestine, when freed from Ottoman control, would become an international zone not under direct French or British colonial control. Shortly thereafter, British foreign minister Arthur Balfour issued the Balfour Declaration, which promised to establish a "Jewish national home" in Palestine, but appeared to contradict the 1915–16 Hussein-McMahon Correspondence, which contained an undertaking to form a united Arab state in exchange for the Great Arab Revolt against the Ottoman Empire in World War I. McMahon's promises could have been seen by Arab nationalists as a pledge of immediate Arab independence, an undertaking violated by the region's subsequent partition into British and French League of Nations mandates under the secret Sykes-Picot Agreement of May 1916, which became the real cornerstone of the geopolitics structuring the entire region. The Balfour Declaration, likewise, was seen by Jewish nationalists as the cornerstone of a future Jewish homeland.

The British-led Egyptian Expeditionary Force, commanded by Edmund Allenby, captured Jerusalem on 9 December 1917 and occupied the whole of the Levant following the defeat of Turkish forces in Palestine at the Battle of Megiddo in September 1918 and the capitulation of Turkey on 31 October.

British Mandate period

Following the First World War and the occupation of the region by the British, the principal Allied and associated powers drafted the mandate, which was formally approved by the League of Nations in 1922. Great Britain administered Palestine on behalf of the League of Nations between 1920 and 1948, a period referred to as the "British Mandate". The preamble of the mandate declared:

Whereas the Principal Allied Powers have also agreed that the Mandatory should be responsible for putting into effect the declaration originally made on November 2nd, 1917, by the Government of His Britannic Majesty, and adopted by the said Powers, in favor of the establishment in Palestine of a national home for the Jewish people, it being clearly understood that nothing should be done which might prejudice the civil and religious rights of existing non-Jewish communities in Palestine, or the rights and political status enjoyed by Jews in any other country.

Not all were satisfied with the mandate. The League of Nations' objective with the mandate system was to administer the parts of the former Ottoman Empire, which the Middle East had controlled since the 16th century, "until such time as they are able to stand alone". Some of the Arabs felt that Britain was violating the McMahon-Hussein Correspondence and the understanding of the Arab Revolt. Some wanted unification with Syria: in February 1919, several Muslim and Christian groups from Jaffa and Jerusalem met and adopted a platform endorsing unity with Syria and opposition to Zionism (this is sometimes called the First Palestinian National Congress). A letter was sent to Damascus authorizing Faisal to represent the Arabs of Palestine at the Paris Peace Conference. In May 1919 a Syrian National Congress was held in Damascus, and a Palestinian delegation attended its sessions.

In April 1920, violent Arab disturbances against the Jews in Jerusalem occurred, which came to be known as the 1920 Palestine riots. The riots followed rising tensions in Arab-Jewish relations over the implications of Zionist immigration. The British military administration's erratic response failed to contain the rioting, which continued for four days. As a result of the events, trust among the British, Jews, and Arabs eroded. One consequence was that the Jewish community increased moves towards an autonomous infrastructure and security apparatus parallel to that of the British administration.

In April 1920, the Allied Supreme Council (the United States, Great Britain, France, Italy and Japan) met at Sanremo and formal decisions were taken on the allocation of mandate territories. The United Kingdom obtained a mandate for Palestine and France obtained a mandate for Syria. The boundaries of the mandates and the conditions under which they were to be held were not decided. The Zionist Organization's representative at Sanremo, Chaim Weizmann, subsequently reported to his colleagues in London:There are still important details outstanding, such as the actual terms of the mandate and the question of the boundaries in Palestine. There is the delimitation of the boundary between French Syria and Palestine, which will constitute the northern frontier and the eastern line of demarcation, adjoining Arab Syria. The latter is not likely to be fixed until the Emir Feisal attends the Peace Conference, probably in Paris.

In July 1920, the French drove Faisal bin Husayn from Damascus, ending his already negligible control over the region of Transjordan, where local chiefs traditionally resisted any central authority. The sheikhs, who had earlier pledged their loyalty to the Sharif of Mecca, asked the British to undertake the region's administration. Herbert Samuel asked for the extension of the Palestine government's authority to Transjordan, but at meetings in Cairo and Jerusalem between Winston Churchill and Emir Abdullah in March 1921 it was agreed that Abdullah would administer the territory (initially for six months only) on behalf of the Palestine administration. In the summer of 1921 Transjordan was included within the Mandate, but excluded from the provisions for a Jewish National Home. On 24 July 1922, the League of Nations approved the terms of the British Mandate over Palestine and Transjordan. On 16 September the League formally approved a memorandum from Lord Balfour confirming the exemption of Transjordan from the clauses of the mandate concerning the creation of a Jewish national home and Jewish settlement. With Transjordan coming under the administration of the British Mandate, the mandate's collective territory became constituted of 23% Palestine and 77% Transjordan. The mandate for Palestine, while specifying actions in support of Jewish immigration and political status, stated, in Article 25, that in the territory to the east of the Jordan River, Britain could 'postpone or withhold' those articles of the Mandate concerning a Jewish National Home. Transjordan was a very sparsely populated region (especially in comparison with Palestine proper) due to its relatively limited resources and largely desert environment.

In 1923, an agreement between the United Kingdom and France confirmed the border between the British Mandate of Palestine and the French Mandate of Syria. The British handed over the southern Golan Heights to the French in return for the northern Jordan Valley. The border was re-drawn so that both sides of the Jordan River and the whole of the Sea of Galilee, including a 10-metre-wide strip along the northeastern shore, were made a part of Palestine, with the provisions that Syria have fishing and navigation rights in the lake.

The first reference to the Palestinians, without qualifying them as Arabs, is to be found in a document of the Permanent Executive Committee, composed of Muslims and Christians, presenting a series of formal complaints to the British authorities on 26 July 1928.

Governance 
The most important Palestinian leader in Mandatory Palestine was Haj Amin al-Husayni. He was appointed "Grand Mufti of Palestine" by the British and used his position to lead the Palestinians' unsuccessful struggle for independence. He fled Palestine in 1937 to avoid being arrested for leading the Great Revolt but would still lead the Palestinians in his exile.

In 1921, the British created the institution the Muslim Higher Council to provide religious leadership. They proceeded to recognize it as representing the Arabs of Palestine, in spite of the existing nationalist Executive Arab Committee that already sought that role. The council's duties included administration of religious endowments and appointment of religious judges and local muftis. Haj Amin was chosen to head the institution and members of his family were given precedence on the council. The rival family, the Nashashibis, were directed towards municipal positions. This was in line with the British strategy to nurture rivalries among the Palestinian elite. They succeeded and the schism created would hamper the growth of modern forms of national organization for decades to come.

Al-Istiqlal, the Arab Independence Party, was established officially in 1932 but existed unofficially as early as 1930. The Arab Higher Committee (al-Lajna al-'Arabiyya al-'Ulya), consisting of members of the Husaynis and Nashashibis, was established shortly after the outbreak of the Great Revolt in 1936.

Demographics and Jewish immigration 
Against the wishes of the Palestinians, the British facilitated Zionist settlement of Palestine by upholding liberal immigration policies and allowing Jewish mass immigration. The immigration caused a major demographic shift and alarmed the Arabs. In the census conducted in 1922 the population of Palestine was 763,550 of which 89 percent were Arabs and 11 percent Jews. By the end of 1947 the Jewish share of the population had risen to 31 percent.

In 1933, Adolf Hitler came to power in Germany, and the Haavara agreement between the Zionist Federation and the Third Reich was to facilitate the emigration of German Jews. Jewish immigration dramatically increased during the mid-1930s. In 1935, 62,000 Jews entered Palestine, the highest number since the mandate began in 1920.

Between 1922 and 1947, the annual growth rate of the Jewish sector of the economy was 13.2%, mainly due to immigration and foreign capital, while that of the Arab was 6.5%. Per capita, these figures were 4.8% and 3.6% respectively. By 1936, the Jewish sector had eclipsed the Arab one, and Jewish individuals earned 2.6 times as much as Arabs. In terms of human capital, there was a huge difference. For instance, the literacy rates in 1932 were 86% for the Jews against 22% for the Arabs, although Arab literacy was steadily increasing. Palestine continued to develop economically during World War II, with increased industrial and agricultural outputs and the period was considered an "economic Boom". In terms of Arab-Jewish relations, these were relatively quiet times.

Starting in 1939 and throughout World War II, Britain reduced the number of Jewish immigrants allowed into Palestine, following the publication of the White Paper of 1939. Once the 15,000 annual quota was exceeded, Jews fleeing Nazi persecution were placed in detention camps or deported to places such as Mauritius. The Anglo-American Committee of Inquiry's findings published in 1946 divested the White Paper and caused Britain to ease restrictions on Jewish immigration to Palestine.

1936–1939 Revolt 

The revolt of 1936-1939, also known as the Great Palestinian Revolt, is one of the formative events of Palestinian nationalism. Driven by resentment with British rule and with the Zionist settlement of Palestine, the revolt began as a general strike but evolved into an armed insurrection. The British response to the revolt was harsh and it expanded its military force in Palestine, deploying over 100,000 troops. Imprisonment without charges or trial, curfews, whip lashings, house demolitions, and collective punishment against villages and families were some of the practices it employed to quell the revolt. An estimated 10 percent of the adult Palestinian male population were killed, wounded, deported, or imprisoned

The revolt was a disaster for the Palestinians and it failed to achieve its two goals; the uprooting of the Zionist settlement and the termination of the British Mandate. Due to the British crackdown, the Palestinians were left without a local leadership, as most of their leaders either fled the country or were deported by the authorities. Infighting between rival families deepened rifts in Palestinian society causing irreparable damage, all while the Zionists mobilized and British-Zionist cooperation increased.

General strike 
In November 1935 the guerilla leader Sheikh Izz ad-Din al-Qassam was killed in a shootout with British police in the hills near Jenin. Thousands attended his funeral which turned into demonstrations. His death became a rallying call for others.

Al-Istiqlal called a general strike in April 1936 and the Palestinian leadership gave its blessing. The strike ended after a few months when Arab leaders instructed the Palestinians to desist in exchange for negotiations with the British on the future of Palestine. Meanwhile, volunteers led by Fawzi al-Qawiqji entered the country and engaged in unsuccessful guerilla warfare. The British destroyed much of al-Qawiqji's forces and by mid-October it left the country.

Peel Commission 
In 1937, the Peel Commission recommended dividing Palestine into a Jewish and an Arab state. The Jews would receive Tel Aviv, the coastal plain, the northern valleys, and parts of the Galile, while the Arabs would receive the West Bank of the river Jordan, central Palestine and the southern desert. Britain would retain Jerusalem and a narrow corridor linking it to the sea. Importantly, the commission envisaged a population exchange similar to the exchanges between Turkey and Greece in the 1920s; thousands of Arabs who had their homes within the territory of the Jewish state would be forcibly removed.

The Zionist leadership supported partition in principle, but expressed reservations about the commission's findings and some opponents thought that the territory allotted to the Jewish state was too small. Ben-Gurion saw it as the first step in a plan to gradually claim the entire country on both sides of Jordan. He was especially pleased with the commission's recommendation of forced population transfer; a "really Jewish" state is about to become reality, he wrote in his diary.

The Palestinians led by the mufti opposed dividing Palestine, but a minority, led by the Nashashibis, supported it. This led to animosity between Husayni's and Nashashibi's supporters as the former accused the latter of treason.

Escalation and disintegration 
The revolt escalated in the latter half of 1937 and numerous rebel bands emerged. The rebels not only attacked British and Jewish targets, but also Palestinians who were accused of collaborating with the enemy. At the same time, the British enacted oppressive emergency regulations causing strife for the civilians. Popular support for the rebels declined.

The revolt waned in the fall 1938 as the British organized the rebels' opponents in armed groups called "peace bands," headed by Fakhri al-Nashashibi and Fakhri 'Abd al-Hadi, previously Qawiqji's deputy. Aided by these, the British effectively exposed the rebels' hiding places and by late 1939 all rebel activity had ceased.

Zionist mobilization 
The Haganah (Hebrew for "defense"), a Jewish paramilitary organization, actively supported British efforts to quell the revolt. Although the British administration did not officially recognize the Haganah, the British security forces cooperated with it by forming the Jewish Settlement Police and Special Night Squads. A splinter group of the Haganah, called the Irgun (or Etzel) adopted a policy of violent retaliation against Arabs for attacks on Jews; the Hagana has adopted a policy of restraint. In a meeting in Alexandria in July 1937 between Irgun founder Ze'ev Jabotinsky, commander Col. Robert Bitker and chief-of-staff Moshe Rosenberg, the need for indiscriminate retaliation due to the difficulty of limiting operations to only the "guilty" was explained. The Irgun launched attacks against public gathering places such as markets and cafes.

World War II

When the Second World War broke out, the Jewish population sided with Britain. David Ben-Gurion, head of the Jewish Agency, defined the policy with what became a famous motto: "We will fight the war as if there were no White Paper, and we will fight the White Paper as if there were no war." While this represented the Jewish population as a whole, there were exceptions (see below).

As in most of the Arab world, there was no unanimity among the Palestinian Arabs as to their position regarding the combatants in World War II. A number of leaders and public figures saw an Axis victory as the likely outcome and a way of securing Palestine back from the Zionists and the British. Mohammad Amin al-Husayni, Grand Mufti of Jerusalem, spent the rest of the war in Nazi Germany and the occupied areas. About 6,000 Palestinian Arabs and 30,000 Palestinian Jews joined the British forces.

On 10 June 1940, Italy declared war on the British Commonwealth and sided with Germany. Within a month, the Italians attacked Palestine from the air, bombing Tel Aviv and Haifa.

In 1942, there was a period of anxiety for the Yishuv, when the forces of German General Erwin Rommel advanced east in North Africa towards the Suez Canal and there was fear that they would conquer Palestine. This event was the direct cause for the founding, with British support, of the Palmach – a highly trained regular unit belonging to Haganah (which was mostly made up of reserve troops).

On 3 July 1944, the British government consented to the establishment of a Jewish Brigade with hand-picked Jewish and also non-Jewish senior officers. The brigade fought in Europe, most notably against the Germans in Italy from March 1945 until the end of the war in May 1945. Members of the Brigade played a key role in the Berihah's efforts to help Jews escape Europe for Palestine. Later, veterans of the Jewish Brigade became key participants of the new State of Israel's Israel Defense Forces.

In 1944 Menachem Begin assumed the Irgun's leadership, determined to force the British government to remove its troops entirely from Palestine. Citing that the British had reneged on their original promise of the Balfour Declaration, and that the White Paper of 1939 restricting Jewish immigration was an escalation of their pro-Arab policy, he decided to break with the Haganah. Soon after he assumed command, a formal 'Declaration of Revolt' was publicized, and armed attacks against British forces were initiated. Lehi, another splinter group, opposed cessation of operations against the British authorities all along. The Jewish Agency, which opposed those actions and the challenge to its role as government in preparation responded with "The Hunting Season" – severe actions against supporters of the Irgun and Lehi, including turning them over to the British.

End of the British Mandate 1945–1948 

In the years following World War II, Britain's control over Palestine became increasingly tenuous. This was caused by a combination of factors, including:
 The costs of maintaining an army of over 100,000 men in Palestine weighed heavily on a British economy suffering from post-war depression, and was another cause for British public opinion to demand an end to the Mandate.
 Rapid deterioration due to the actions of the Jewish paramilitary organizations (Hagana, Irgun and Lehi), involving attacks on strategic installations (by all three) as well as on British forces and officials (by the Irgun and Lehi). This caused severe damage to British morale and prestige, as well as increasing opposition to the mandate in Britain itself, public opinion demanding to "bring the boys home".
 The U.S. Congress was delaying a loan necessary to prevent British bankruptcy. The delays were in response to the British refusal to fulfill a promise given to Truman that 100,000 Holocaust survivors would be allowed to emigrate to Palestine.

In early 1947 the British Government announced their desire to terminate the Mandate, and asked the United Nations General Assembly to make recommendations regarding the future of the country. The British Administration declined to accept the responsibility for implementing any solution that wasn't acceptable to both the Jewish and the Arab communities, or to allow other authorities to take over responsibility for public security prior to the termination of its mandate on 15 May 1948.

UN partition and the 1948 Palestine War

On 29 November 1947, the United Nations General Assembly, voting 33 to 13 in favour with 10 abstentions, adopted Resolution 181 (II) (though not legally binding) recommending a partition with the Economic Union of Mandatory Palestine to follow the termination of the British Mandate. The plan was to partition Palestine into an "Independent Arab state alongside a Jewish States, and the Special International Regime for the City of Jerusalem". Jerusalem was to encompass Bethlehem. Zionist leaders (including the Jewish Agency), accepted the plan, while Palestinian Arab leaders rejected it and all independent Muslim and Arab states voted against it. Almost immediately, sectarian violence erupted and spread, killing hundreds of Arabs, Jews and British over the ensuing months.

The UN resolution was the catalyst for a full scale civil war. For four months, under continuous Arab provocation and attack, the Yishuv was usually on the defensive while occasionally retaliating. Arab volunteers of the Arab Liberation Army entered Palestine to fight alongside the Palestinians, but the April–May offensive of Yishuv forces defeated the Arab forces and Arab Palestinian society collapsed. By the time the armistice was signed, some 700,000 Palestinians caught up in the turmoil fled or were driven from their homes.

On 14 May 1948, David Ben-Gurion and the Jewish People's Council declared the establishment of a Jewish state in Eretz Israel (The Land of Israel), to be known as the State of Israel. The neighbouring Arab states intervened to prevent the partition and support the Palestinian Arab population. While Transjordan and Egypt took control of territory designated for the future Arab State, Syrian and Iraqi expeditionary forces attacked Israel without success. The most intensive battles were waged between the Jordanian and Israeli forces over the control of Jerusalem.

On June 11, a truce was accepted by all parties. Israel used the lull to undertake a large-scale reinforcement of its army. In a series of military operations, during the war it conquered the whole of the Galilee region, both the Lydda and Ramle areas, and the Negev. It also managed to secure, in the Battles of Latrun, a road linking Jerusalem to Israel. However, the neighboring Arab countries signed the 1949 Armistice Agreements that ended the war, and have recognized de facto the new borders of Israel. In this phase, 350,000 more Arab Palestinians fled or were expelled from the conquered areas.

Partition of former Mandatory territory

The Arabs rejected the Partition Plan while the Jews ostensibly accepted it. Following the 1948 Arab–Israeli War, the area allocated to the Palestinian Arabs and the international zone of Jerusalem were occupied by Israel and the neighboring Arab states in accordance with the terms of the 1949 Armistice Agreements. In addition to the UN-partitioned area allotted to the Jewish state, Israel captured and incorporated a further 26% of the British Mandate territory. Jordan retained possession of about 21% of the former Mandate territory. Jerusalem was divided, with Jordan taking the eastern parts, including the Old City, and Israel taking the western parts. In addition, Syria held on to small slivers of the former Mandate territory to the south and east of the Sea of Galilee, which had been allocated in the UN partition plan to the Jewish state. For a description of the massive population movements, Arab and Jewish, at the time of the 1948 war and over the following decades, see Palestinian exodus and Jewish exodus from Arab lands.

Palestinian governorship in Egyptian-controlled Gaza

On the same day that the State of Israel was announced, the Arab League announced that it would set up a single Arab civil administration throughout Palestine.

The All-Palestine Government was established by the Arab League on 22 September 1948, during the 1948 Arab–Israeli War. It was soon recognized by all Arab League members, except Jordan. Though jurisdiction of the Government was declared to cover the whole of the former Mandatory Palestine, its effective jurisdiction was limited to the Gaza Strip. The Prime Minister of the Gaza-seated administration was named Ahmed Hilmi Pasha, and the President was named Hajj Amin al-Husseini, former chairman of the Arab Higher Committee.

The All-Palestine Government is regarded by some as the first attempt to establish an independent Palestinian state. It was under official Egyptian protection, but, on the other hand, it had no executive role, but rather mostly political and symbolic. Its importance gradually declined, especially due to relocation of seat of government from Gaza to Cairo following Israeli incursions in late 1948. Though Gaza Strip returned under Egyptian control later on through the war, the All-Palestine Government remained in-exile in Cairo, managing Gazan affairs from outside.

In 1959, the All-Palestine Government was officially merged into the United Arab Republic, coming under formal Egyptian military administration, with the appointment of Egyptian military administrators in Gaza. Egypt, however, both formally and informally denounced any and all territorial claims to Palestinian territory, in contrast to the government of Transjordan, which declared its annexation of the Palestinian West Bank. The All-Palestine Government's credentials as a bona fide sovereign state were questioned by many, particularly due to the effective reliance upon not only Egyptian military support, but Egyptian political and economic power.

Annexation of the West Bank of Jordan
Shortly after the proclamation of All-Palestine Government in Gaza, the Jericho Conference named King Abdullah I of Transjordan, "King of Arab Palestine". The Congress called for the union of Arab Palestine and Transjordan and Abdullah announced his intention to annex the West Bank. The other Arab League member states opposed Abdullah's plan.

The New Historians, like Avi Shlaim, hold that there was an unwritten secret agreement between King Abdullah of Transjordan and Israeli authorities to partition the territory between themselves, and that this translated into each side limiting their objectives and exercising mutual restraint during the 1948 war.

The presence of a large number of immigrants and refugees from the now dissolved Mandate of Palestine fueled the regional ambitions of King Abdullah I, who sought control over what had been the British Jerusalem and Samaria districts on the West Bank of the Jordan River. Towards this goal the king granted Jordanian citizenship to all Arab holders of the Palestinian Mandate identity documents in February 1949, and outlawed the terms "Palestinian" and "Transjordanian" from official usage, changing the country's name from the Emirate of Trans-Jordan to the Hashemite Kingdom of Jordan. With the formal union of the East and West Banks in 1950, the number of Palestinians in the kingdom rose by another 720,000, of whom 440,000 were West Bank residents and 280,000 were refugees from other areas of the former Mandate then living on the West Bank. Palestinians became the majority in Jordan although most believed their return to what was now the state of Israel was imminent.

Israel and the occupied Palestinian territories

Six-Day War and Yom Kippur War

In the course of the Six-Day War in June 1967, Israel captured the rest of the area that had been part of the British Mandate of Palestine, taking the West Bank (including East Jerusalem) from Jordan and the Gaza Strip from Egypt. Following military threats by Egypt and Syria, including Egyptian president Nasser's demand of the UN to remove its peace-keeping troops from the Egyptian-Israeli border, in June 1967 Israeli forces went to action against Egypt, Syria and Jordan. As a result of that war, the Israel Defense Forces conquered the West Bank, the Gaza Strip, the Golan Heights, and the Sinai Peninsula bringing them under military rule. Israel also pushed Arab forces back from East Jerusalem, which Jews had not been permitted to visit during the prior Jordanian rule. East Jerusalem was allegedly annexed by Israel as part of its capital, though this action has not been recognized internationally. Israel also started building settlements on the occupied land.

The United Nations Security Council passed Resolution 242, promoting the "land for peace" formula, which called for Israeli withdrawal from territories occupied in 1967, in return for the end of all states of belligerency by the aforementioned Arab League nations. Palestinians continued longstanding demands for the destruction of Israel or made a new demand for self-determination in a separate independent Arab state in the West Bank and Gaza Strip similar to but smaller than the original Partition area that Palestinians and the Arab League had rejected for statehood in 1947.

In the course of 1973 Yom Kippur War, military forces of Egypt crossed the Suez canal and Syria to regain the Golan heights. The attacking military forces of Syria were pushed back. After a cease fire, Egyptian President Sadat Anwar Sadat started peace talks with the U.S. and Israel. Israel returned the Sinai Peninsula to Egypt as part of the 1978 Camp David Peace Accords between Egypt and Israel.

First Intifada, Oslo Accords and the State of Palestine

From 1987 to 1993, the First Palestinian Intifada against Israel took place. Attempts at the Israeli–Palestinian peace process were made at the Madrid Conference of 1991.

Following the historic 1993 Oslo Peace Accords between Palestinians and Israel (the "Oslo Accords"), which gave the Palestinians limited self-rule in some parts of the occupied territories through the Palestinian Authority, and other detailed negotiations, proposals for a Palestinian state gained momentum. They were soon followed in 1993 by the Israel–Jordan peace treaty.

Second Intifada and later 

After few years of on-and-off negotiations, the Palestinians began an uprising against Israel. This was known as the Al-Aqsa Intifada. The events were highlighted in world media by Palestinian suicide bombings in Israel that killed many civilians, and by Israeli Security Forces full-fledged invasions into civilian areas along with some targeted killings of Palestinian militant leaders and organizers. Israel began building a complex security barrier to block suicide bombers crossing into Israel from the West Bank in 2002.

Also in 2002, the Road map for peace calling for the resolution of the Israeli–Palestinian conflict was proposed by a "quartet": the United States, European Union, Russia, and United Nations. U.S. President George W. Bush in a speech on 24 June 2002, called for an independent Palestinian state living side by side with Israel in peace. Bush was the first U.S. president to explicitly call for such a Palestinian state.

Following Israel's unilateral disengagement plan of 2004, it withdrew all settlers and most of the military presence from the Gaza strip, but maintained control of the air space and coast. Israel also dismantled four settlements in northern West Bank in September 2005.

Gaza-West Bank split 
On 25 January 2006 Palestinian legislative elections were held in order to elect the second Palestinian Legislative Council, the legislature of the Palestinian Authority (PA). Hamas won the election, securing 74 of the 132 seats while its rival Fatah only won 45 seats. The outcome of the election shocked the world and meant that Hamas would take over most of PA's institutions. Hamas tried to form a unity government with Fatah, but the offer was rebuffed. Meanwhile, Israel and the US imposed sanctions on the PA in order to destabilize the Palestinian government so that it would fail and new elections would be called. Those efforts were ultimately unsuccessful but lead to a rift between Hamas and Fatah.

In June 2006, Palestinian militants affiliated with Hamas carried out a cross-border raid from Gaza into Israel through a tunnel dug for the purpose of attacking Israel. An Israeli soldier, Gilad Shalit, was captured and taken to Gaza by the militants. He would be held for five years until he was released in 2011 in exchange for over 1,000 Palestinian prisoners imprisoned by Israel. The raid caused Israel to large several large-scale invasions of Gaza in the summer and autumn of 2006 attempting to rescue their captured soldier. Over 500 Palestinians and 11 Israelis were killed during the hostilities but ultimately they were unsuccessful in retrieving Shalit.

Relations between Hamas and Fatah deteriorated further as Palestinian President Mahmoud Abbas attempted to dismiss the Hamas-led coalition government in June 2007. Hamas objected to this move being illegal and street battles between Hamas and Fatah members broke out in what came to be known as the 2007 Battle of Gaza. Hamas emerged victorious and took control of the Gaza Strip.

From that point on, governance of the Palestinian territories were split between Hamas and Fatah. Hamas, branded an Islamist terror organization by the EU and several Western countries, in control of Gaza and Fatah in control of the West Bank.

As of July 2009, approximately 305,000 Israelis lived in 121 settlements in the West Bank. The 2.4 million West Bank Palestinians (according to Palestinian evaluations) live primarily in four blocs centered in Hebron, Ramallah, Nablus, and Jericho.

Observer status of State of Palestine 

On 23 September 2011, President Mahmoud Abbas on behalf of the Palestine Liberation Organisation submitted an application for membership of Palestine in the United Nations. The campaign, dubbed "Palestine 194", was formally backed by the Arab League in May, and was officially confirmed by the PLO on 26 June. The decision was labelled by the Israeli government as a unilateral step, while the Palestinian government countered that it is essential to overcoming the current impasse. Several other countries, such as Germany and Canada, have also denounced the decision and called for a prompt return to negotiations. Many others, however, such as Norway and Russia, have endorsed the plan, as has Secretary-General Ban Ki-moon, who stated, "UN members are entitled whether to vote for or against the Palestinian statehood recognition at the UN."

In July 2012, it was reported that Hamas Government in Gaza was considering declaring the independence of the Gaza Strip with the help of Egypt. In August 2012, Foreign Minister of the PNA Riyad al-Malki told reporters in Ramallah that PNA would renew effort to upgrade the Palestinian (PLO) status to "full member state" at the U.N. General Assembly on 27 September 2012. By September 2012, with their application for full membership stalled due to the inability of Security Council members to "make a unanimous recommendation", Palestine had decided to pursue an upgrade in status from "observer entity" to 'non-member observer state'. On November 27, it was announced that the appeal had been officially made, and would be put to a vote in the General Assembly on November 29, where their status upgrade was expected to be supported by a majority of states. In addition to granting Palestine "non-member observer state status", the draft resolution "expresses the hope that the Security Council will consider favourably the application submitted on 23 September 2011 by the State of Palestine for admission to full membership in the United Nations, endorses the two state solution based on the pre-1967 borders, and stresses the need for an immediate resumption of negotiations between the two parties".

On 29 November 2012, in a 138–9 vote (with 41 abstaining), General Assembly resolution 67/19 passed, upgrading Palestine to "non-member observer state" status in the United Nations. The new status equates Palestine's with that of the Holy See. The change in status was described by The Independent as "de facto recognition of the sovereign state of Palestine".

The UN has permitted Palestine to title its representative office to the UN as "The Permanent Observer Mission of the State of Palestine to the United Nations", and Palestine has started to re-title its name accordingly on postal stamps, official documents and passports, whilst it has instructed its diplomats to officially represent "The State of Palestine", as opposed to the "Palestine National Authority". Additionally, on 17 December 2012, UN Chief of Protocol Yeocheol Yoon decided that "the designation of "State of Palestine" shall be used by the Secretariat in all official United Nations documents", thus recognising the PLO-proclaimed State of Palestine as being sovereign over the territories Palestine and its citizens under international law.

By February 2013, 131 (67.9%) of the 193 member states of the United Nations had recognised the State of Palestine. Many of the countries that do not recognise the State of Palestine nevertheless recognise the PLO as the "representative of the Palestinian people".

Graphical overview of Palestine's historical sovereign powers

See also

Notes

Citations

Bibliography

General

Ancient history

Assyrian period

Babylonian period

Persian period

Hellenistic period

Roman period

Middle Ages

Byzantine period

Early Muslim period

Crusader period

Renaissance and early modern history

Modern history

Other sources

News media

Online sources

Primary sources

External links
 Picturesque Palestine, Sinai and Egypt by Colonel Sir Charles William Wilson, ed. (published 1881–1884) image gallery at New York Public Library
 A chronology of milestones in Palestine's modern history by Al Jazeera
 Holy land Maps
 A map of Palestine from 1475, considered one of the earliest printed maps.
 Syria and Palestine from 1920

 
Palestine